= Martinniemi =

Coordinates: 65.2125°N 25.3097°E

- District of Oulu
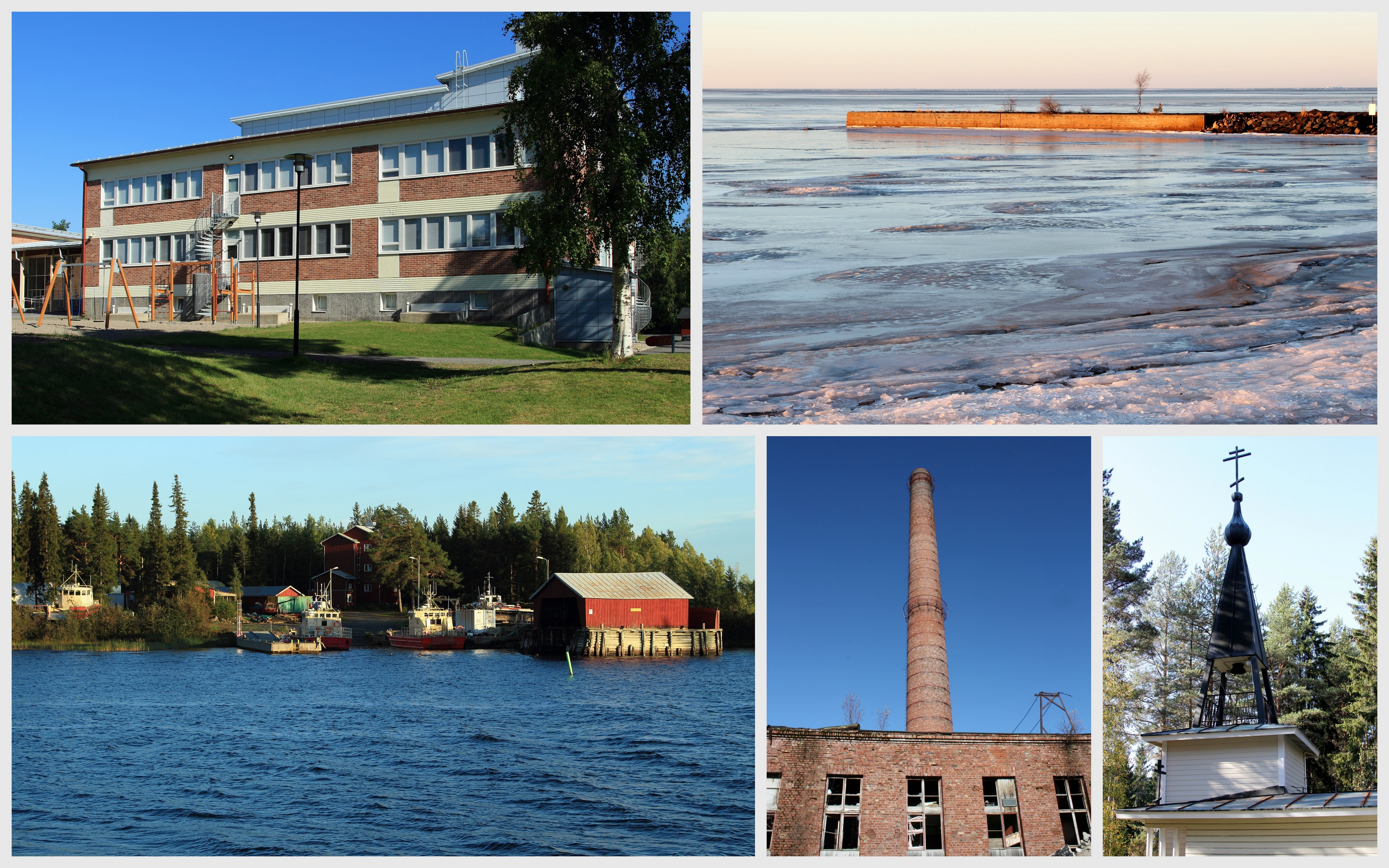
- Interactive map of Martinniemi
- Country: Finland
- City: Oulu
- Areas of Oulu: Haukipudas area
- Established: 1.1.2013

Population (2014)
  - Total: 2 863
- Postal code: 90850

Martinniemi is a district of Oulu, Finland. Together with Haukipudas and Jokikylä districts, it forms the Haukipudas area. Martinniemi is located in north of the river delta of the Kiiminkijoki river. It is bounded by the Bothnian Bay in the west, the Jokikylä district in the east, the Ii municipality in the north and the Kiiminkijoki river and the Haukipudas district in the south. The district was established in 2013 when the Haukipudas municipality together with Kiiminki, Oulunsalo and Yli-Ii municipalities were merged with the city of Oulu.
