= Haukipudas (district) =

Coordinates: 65.1764°N 25.3531°E

- District of Oulu
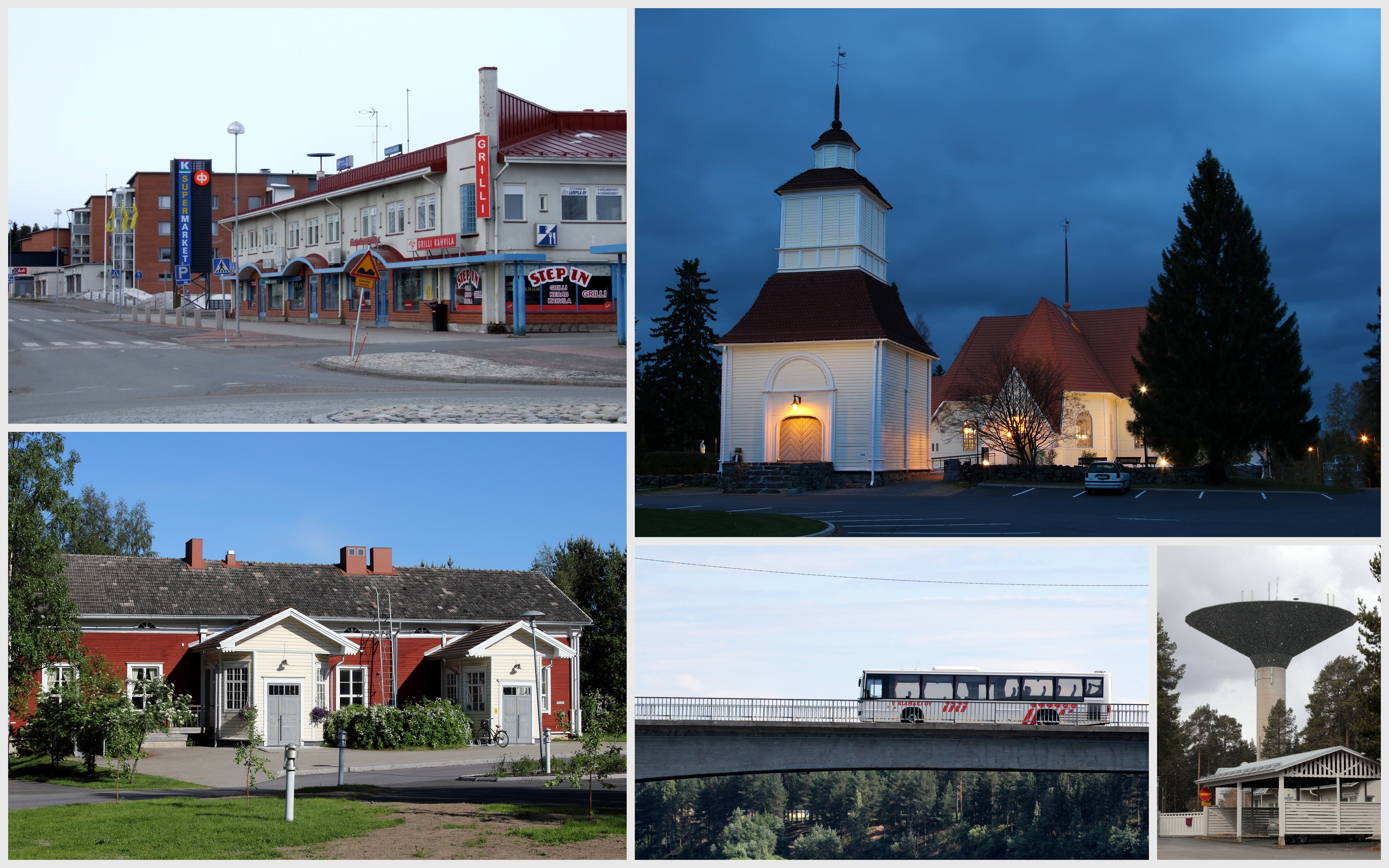
- Interactive map of Haukipudas
- Country: Finland
- City: Oulu
- Areas of Oulu: Haukipudas area

Population (2013)
  - Total: 9 098
- Postal code: 90830

Haukipudas is a district of Oulu, Finland. Together with Jokikylä and Martinniemi districts, it forms the Haukipudas area. Haukipudas is located in the river delta of the Kiiminkijoki river. It is bounded by the Bothnian Bay in the west, National road 4 in the east, Martinniemi district in the north and Kello district in the south. The district was established in 2013 when the Haukipudas municipality together with Kiiminki, Oulunsalo and Yli-Ii municipalities were merged with the city of Oulu.
