= Kiiminki (district) =

Coordinates: 65.1289°N 25.7756°E

- District of Oulu
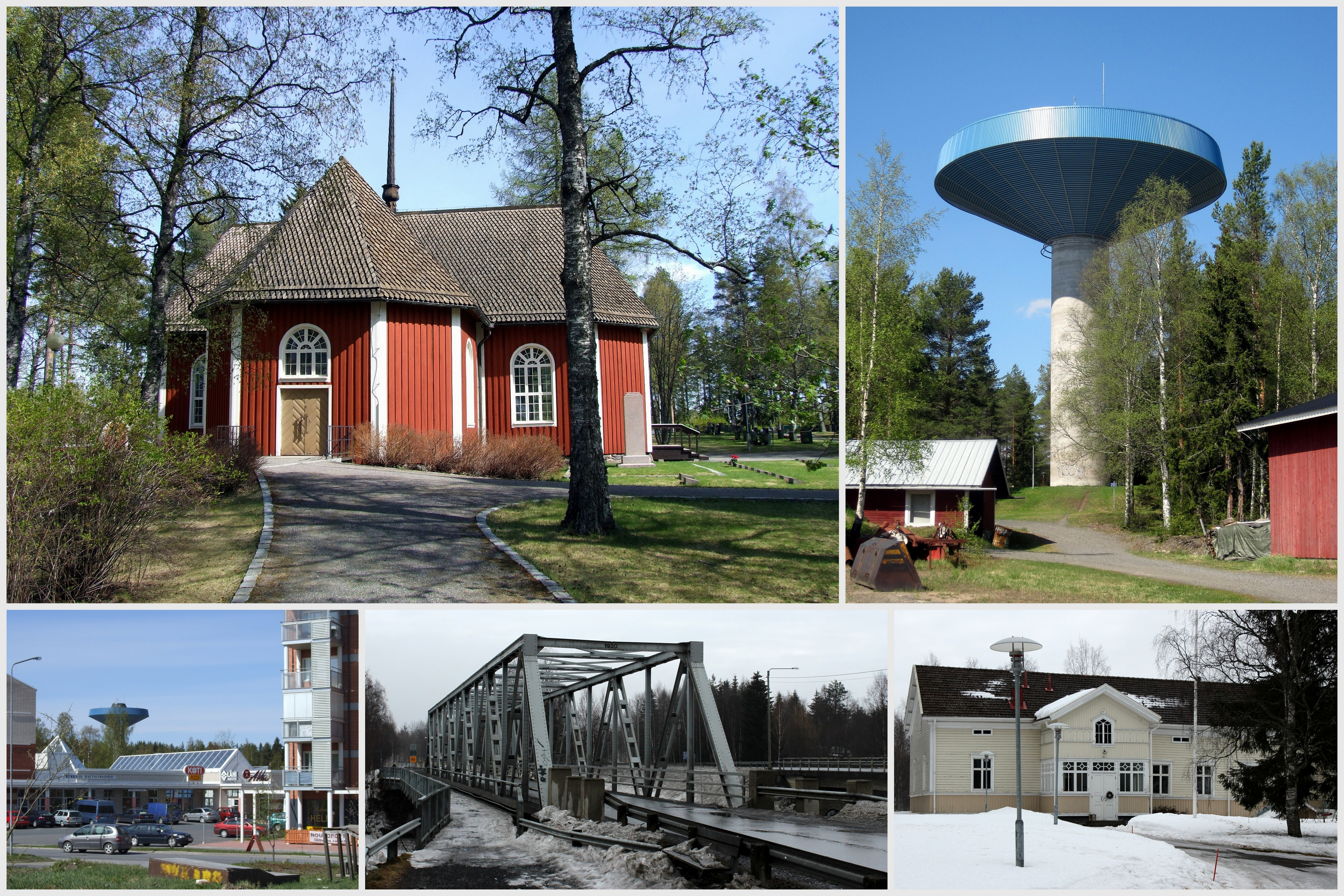
- Interactive map of Kiiminki
- Country: Finland
- City: Oulu
- Areas of Oulu: Kiiminki area

Population (2013)
  - Total: 5 715
- Postal code: 90900

Kiiminki (Swedish: Kiminge) is a district of Oulu, Finland. Together with Alakylä, Hannus and Huttukylä districts, it forms the Kiiminki area. The center of the district is located where the National road 20 crosses the Kiiminkijoki river. The district was established in 2013 when the Kiiminki municipality together with Haukipudas, Oulunsalo and Yli-Ii municipalities were merged with the city of Oulu.

The wooden Kiiminki Church, built in 1760, is located near the center of the district. It is one of the best preserved 18th century wooden churches in Finland. The Koitelinkoski recreation area in located in the southern part of the district.
