= Ylönen =

Ylönen is a Finnish surname. Notable people with the surname include:

- Antti Ylönen (born 1983), Finnish ice hockey defenceman currently playing for Kärpät of the SM-liiga
- Harri Ylönen (born 1972), Finnish former footballer and manager
- Jesse Ylönen (born 1999), American-born Finnish professional ice hockey right winger
- Juha Ylönen (born 1972), former professional ice hockey centre
- Lauri Ylönen (born 1979), the frontman of the Finnish alternative rock band, The Rasmus
- Petri Ylönen (born 1962), Finnish born retired ice hockey goaltender who played in the French national ice hockey team
- Rafael Ylönen (1906–1997), Finnish gymnast
- Sebastian Ylönen (born 1991), French ice hockey goaltender
- Sirpa Ylönen (1957–2025), Finnish sport shooter
- Urpo Ylönen (born 1943), goaltending coach and a retired professional ice hockey player who played in the SM-liiga
- Vilho Ylönen (1918–2000), Finnish skier and sport shooter

== See also ==
- The Urpo Ylönen trophy is an ice hockey award given by the Finnish SM-liiga to the best goalie of the season
