= Liminka =

Liminka Limingo
- Municipality
- Limingan kunta Limingo kommun
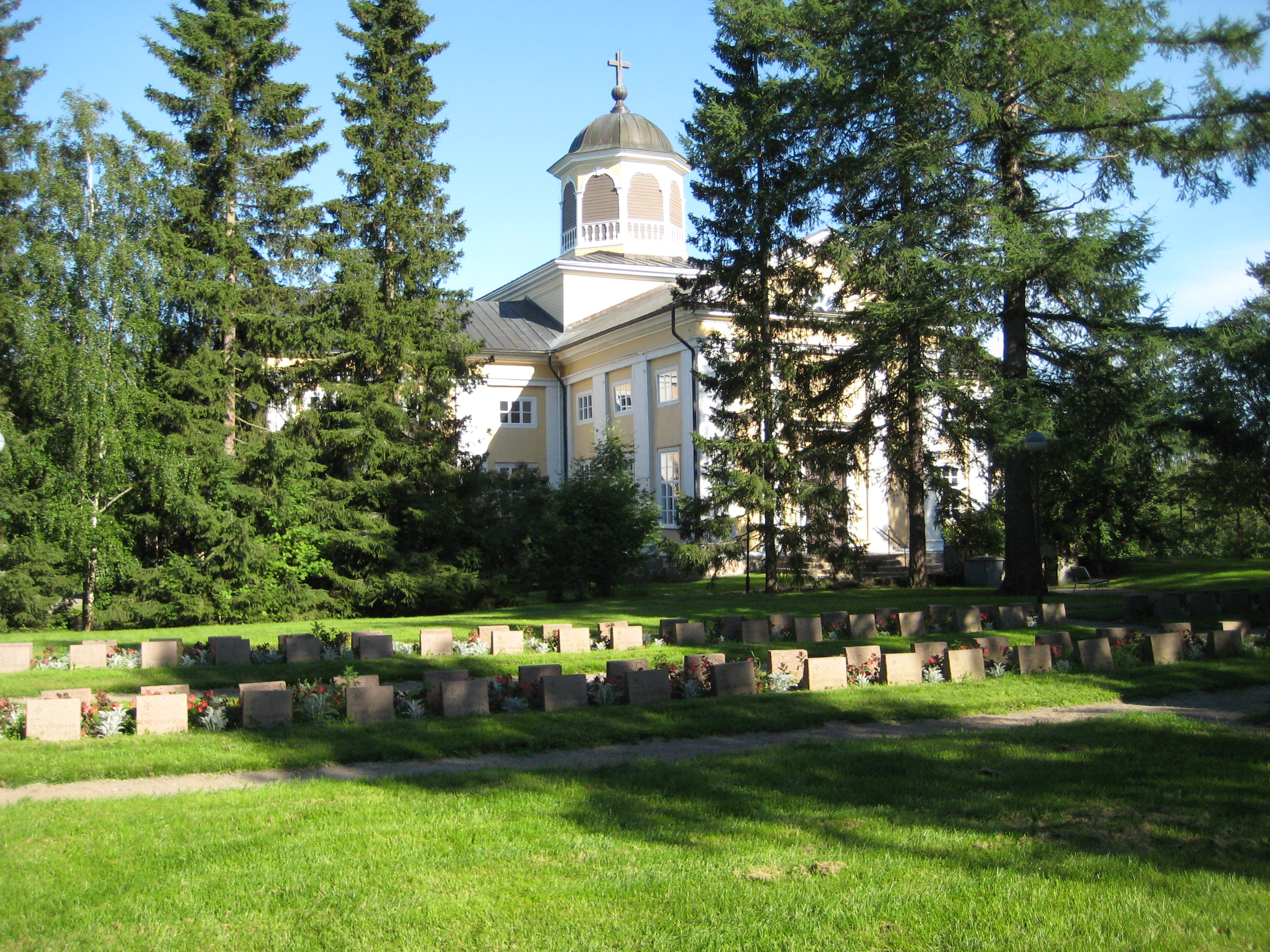
- Liminka Church

- Coat of arms

- Location of Liminka in Finland
- Interactive map of Liminka
- Coordinates: 64°48.5′N 025°25′E
- Country: Finland
- Region: North Ostrobothnia
- Sub-region: Oulu
- Charter: 1477

Government
  - Municipality manager: Pekka Rajala

Area (2018-01-01)
  - Total: 651.71 km^{2} (251.63 sq mi)
  - Land: 637.31 km^{2} (246.07 sq mi)
  - Water: 14.54 km^{2} (5.61 sq mi)
  - Rank: 136th largest in Finland

Population (2025-12-31)
  - Total: 10,116
  - Rank: 94th largest in Finland
  - Density: 15.87/km^{2} (41.1/sq mi)

Population by native language
  - Finnish: 98.8% (official)
  - Swedish: 0.1%
  - Others: 1.1%

Population by age
  - 0 to 14: 31.8%
  - 15 to 64: 57.7%
  - 65 or older: 10.5%
- Time zone: UTC+02:00 (EET)
  - Summer (DST): UTC+03:00 (EEST)
- Website: www.liminka.fi

Liminka (Swedish: Limingo) is a municipality in the Northern Ostrobothnia region in Finland. Liminka is located about 25 kilometres (16 mi) south of Oulu.

The municipality has a population of 10,116 (31 December 2025) and covers an area of 651.71 square kilometres (251.63 sq mi) of which 14.54 km^{2} (5.61 sq mi) is water. The population density is 15.87 inhabitants per square kilometre (41.1/sq mi). The neighbouring municipalities are Kempele, Lumijoki, Muhos, Oulunsalo, Siikajoki, Siikalatva, Tyrnävä, and Vaala.

The Liminganlahti Bay is a notable bird sanctuary.

== History ==
Liminka was founded in 1477. According to folklore, the name Liminka comes from the fictional giant, Limmi.

== Culture ==
=== Food ===
In the 1980s, meat potatoes, barley rieskas and sweet porridge were named Liminka's local traditional dishes.

== Notable people ==
- Anna-Leena Härkönen (born 1965), author
- Leo Lastumäki (1927–2012), actor
- Hjalmar Mellin (1854-1933), Finnish mathematician known for the Mellin transform, professor
- Juho Sunila (1875–1936), politician; the Prime Minister of Finland (1927–1928, 1931–1932)
- Yrjö Wichmann (1868–1932), linguist and professor
- Antti Ylönen (born 1983), ice hockey defenceman

== Twinnings ==
- Nõo Parish, Estonia
