= Rivinletto Light =

Rivinletto lighthouse Rivinletto
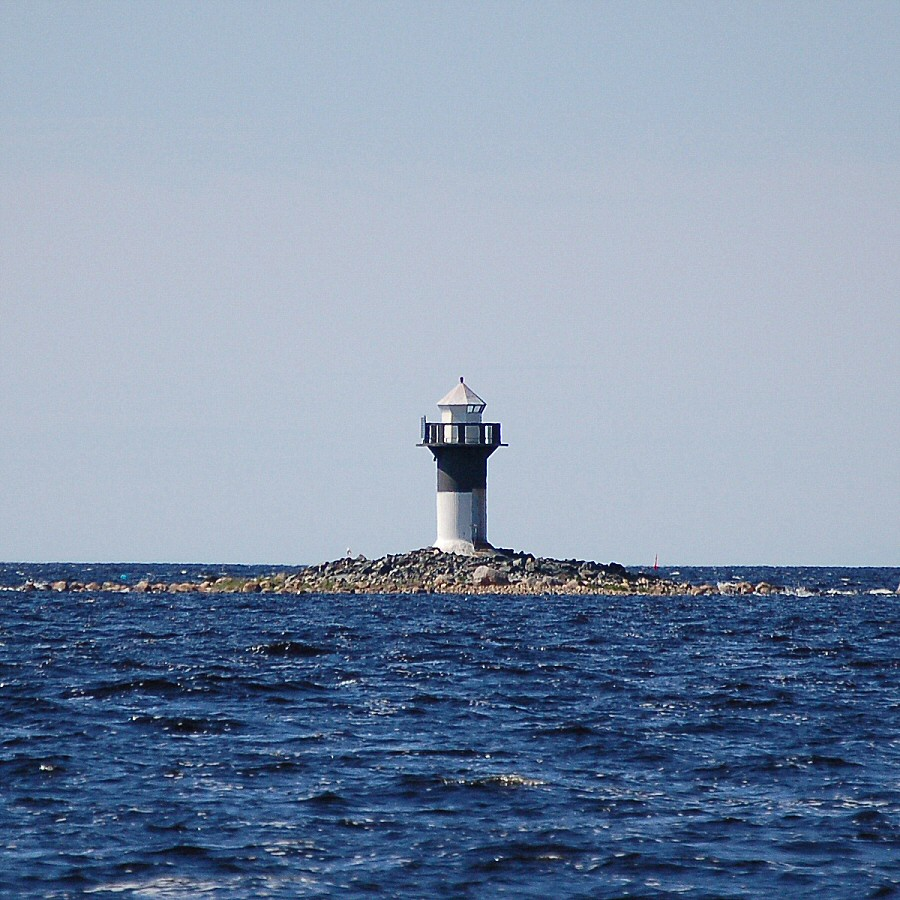
- Location: Haukipudas, Oulu, Finland
- Coordinates: 65°12.11′N 25°14.91′E

Tower
- Constructed: 1939
- Construction: concrete tower
- Height: 8 metres (26 ft)
- Shape: cylindrical tower with balcony and octagonal steel lantern
- Markings: white lower tower, black upper tower, black balcony, white lantern

Light
- First lit: 1939
- Focal height: 8 metres (26 ft)
- Range: 3.5 nautical miles (6.5 km; 4.0 mi)
- Characteristic: Fl W 6s.

Rivinletto Light is a sector light tower located on Kaasamatala, a small island at the mouth of river Kiiminkijoki in Haukipudas, Oulu, Finland. The tower is concrete, with its top half painted black and bottom half painted white. The steel lantern room is painted white. The tower is located on the south side of the main channel of Kiiminkijoki river.

The light is used to guide vessels into the Kiiminkijoki river boating channel and into the Martinniemi harbour. It displays a white flash every three seconds, visible in a sector 016°—248° as seen from a vessel approaching the light. The focal plane of the light is 7.6 metres (24 ft 11 in), and it can be seen from a distance of 3.5 nautical miles (6.5 km; 4.0 mi).
