= Juuso Runtti =

Finnish politician

Juuso Runtti (2 March 1854 – 16 April 1927) was a Finnish farmer, lay preacher and politician, born in Kiiminki. He was a Member of the Parliament of Finland, representing the Finnish Party from 1907 to 1908 and from 1916 to 1918 and the National Coalition Party from 1918 to 1919.
