= Haukipudas Church =

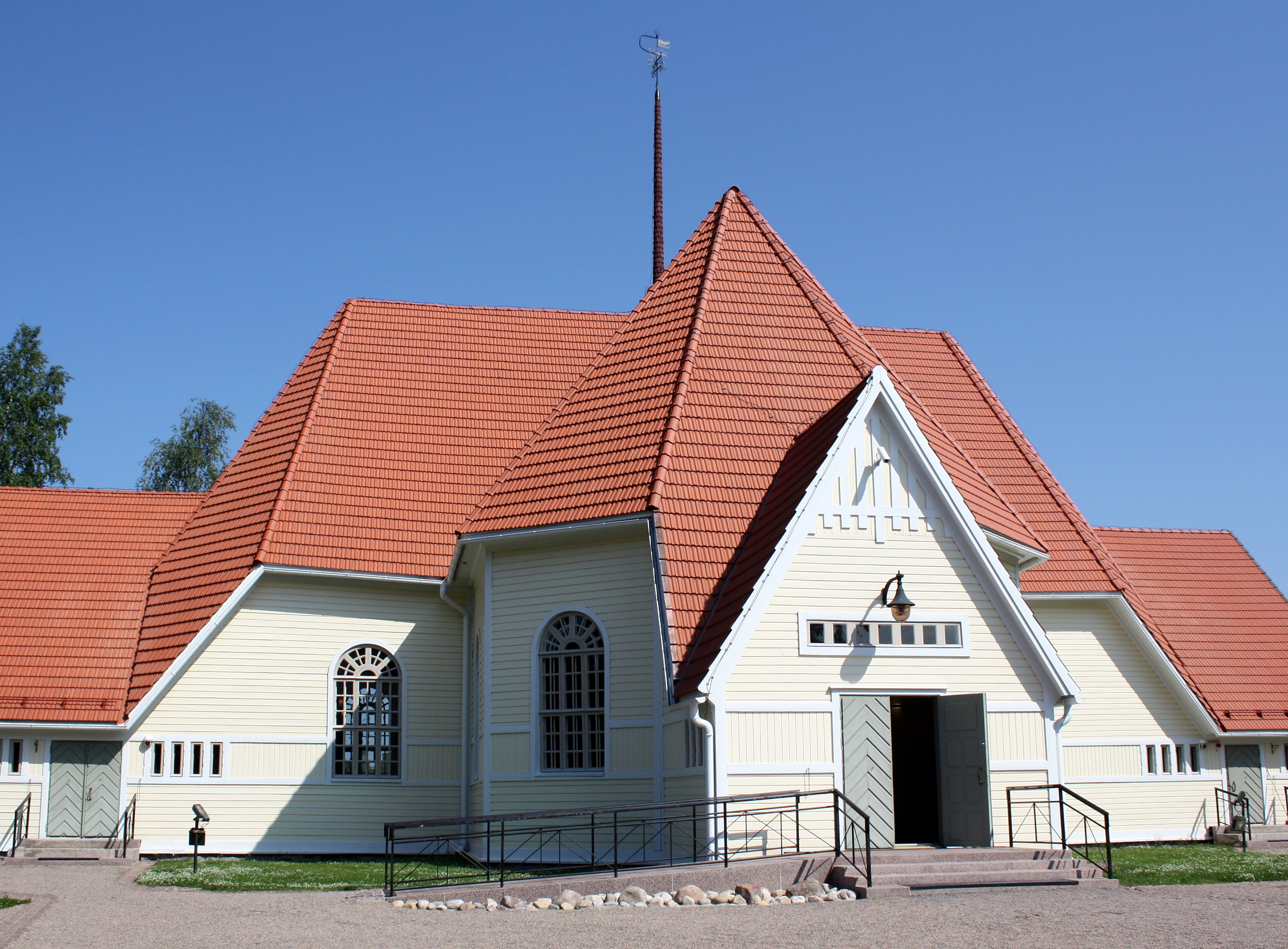
- Haukipudas Church
- 65°08′08″N 25°45′31″E
- Location: Haukipudas, Oulu
- Country: Finland
- Denomination: Lutheran
- Website: http://www.oulunseurakunnat.fi/haukiputaankirkko

History
- Status: Church

Architecture
- Functional status: Active
- Architect: Matti Honka
- Completed: 1762

Administration
- Diocese: Diocese of Oulu
- Parish: Haukipudas parish

The Haukipudas Church is an evangelical Lutheran church in Haukipudas, Oulu.

The church building was designed by Matti Honka, an Ostrobothnian builder of churches in the 18th century. The church was completed in 1762. Major renovations were carried out in the early 1900s according to plans by architect Viktor J. Sucksdorff. The church has been decorated with wall paintings by Mikael Toppelius in the 1770s–1780s. The bell tower was built for the previous church in 1751.
