= Kempele =

- Municipality
- Kempeleen kunta Kempele kommun
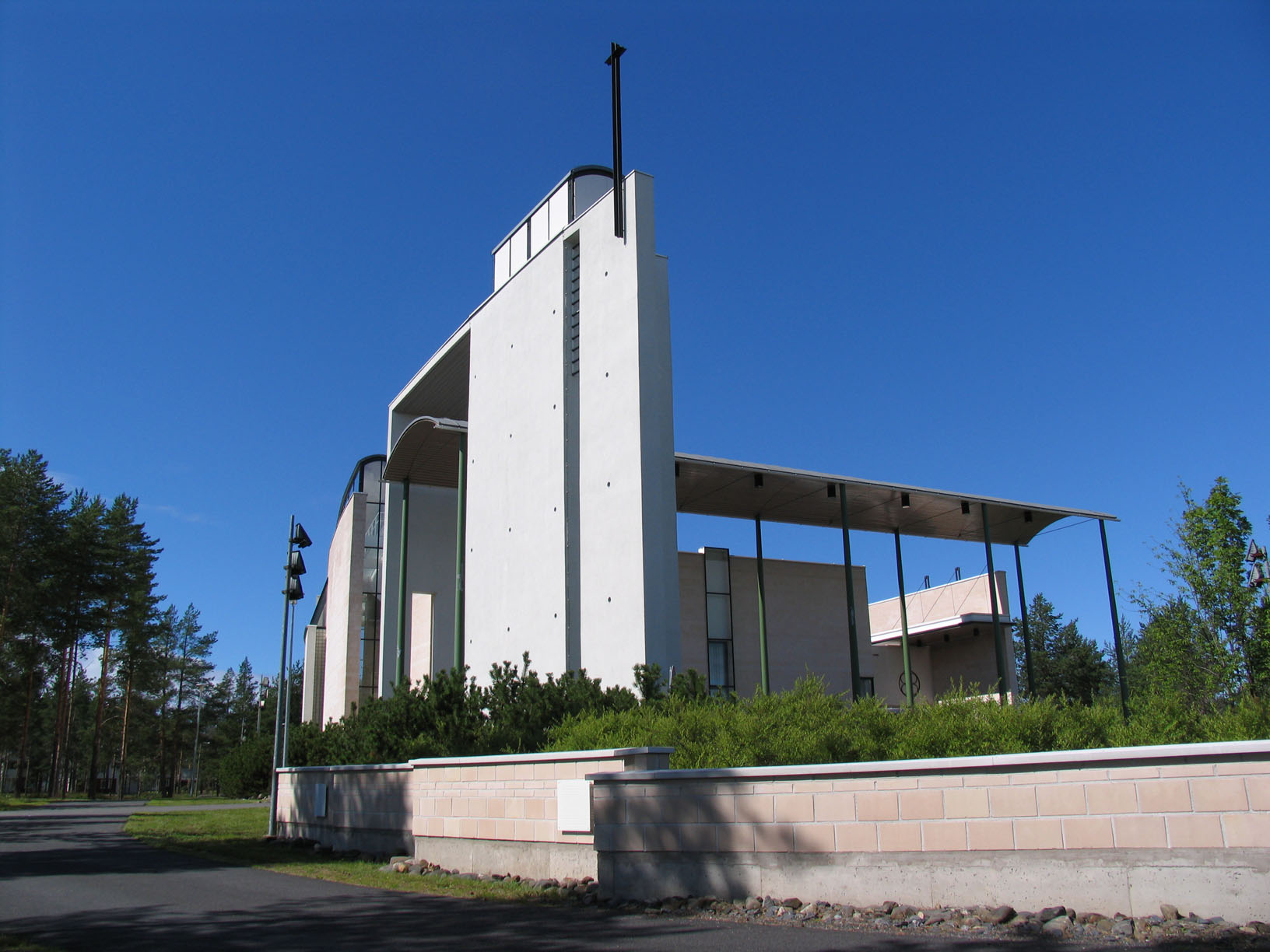
- Holy Trinity Church, Kempele

- Coat of arms

- Location of Kempele in Finland
- Interactive map of Kempele
- Coordinates: 64°54′45″N 025°30′30″E
- Country: Finland
- Region: North Ostrobothnia
- Sub-region: Oulu
- Charter: 1867

Government
  - Municipality manager: Tuomas Lohi

Area (2018-01-01)
  - Total: 110.34 km^{2} (42.60 sq mi)
  - Land: 110.14 km^{2} (42.53 sq mi)
  - Water: 0.23 km^{2} (0.089 sq mi)
  - Rank: 294th largest in Finland

Population (2025-12-31)
  - Total: 19,702
  - Rank: 56th largest in Finland
  - Density: 178.88/km^{2} (463.3/sq mi)

Population by native language
  - Finnish: 98.2% (official)
  - Swedish: 0.1%
  - Sami: 0.1%
  - Others: 1.6%

Population by age
  - 0 to 14: 23.9%
  - 15 to 64: 60.4%
  - 65 or older: 15.6%
- Time zone: UTC+02:00 (EET)
  - Summer (DST): UTC+03:00 (EEST)
- Postal code: 90440, 90450
- Website: www.kempele.fi

Kempele is a municipality 11 kilometres (6.8 mi) south of the city of Oulu and 7 kilometres (4.3 mi) east of the Oulu Airport in Northern Finland. Historically it was in the province of Oulu, but today it is in the region of North Ostrobothnia. The population of Kempele is 19,702 (31 December 2025) and the municipality covers an area of 110.32 square kilometres (42.59 sq mi) (excluding sea), of which 0.21 square kilometres (0.081 sq mi) is inland waters (2018-01-01). The population density is 179 inhabitants per square kilometre (460/sq mi) (31 December 2025). The municipality of Kempele was founded in 1867.

Kempele is the birthplace of former NHL goaltender Pekka Rinne.

The neighbouring municipalities are Liminka, Oulu and Tyrnävä.

== History ==
Kempele was first permanently settled about 500 years ago, at a time when the coastline was closer than it is today. Kempele was considered part of Greater Liminka and consisted of only three houses in 1568, when it was called Kempele for the first time in official records. In 1774 full church privileges were granted to Kempele, which meant separation from Liminka and establishment as an autonomous parish. The municipal government was established in 1867.

== Sights ==
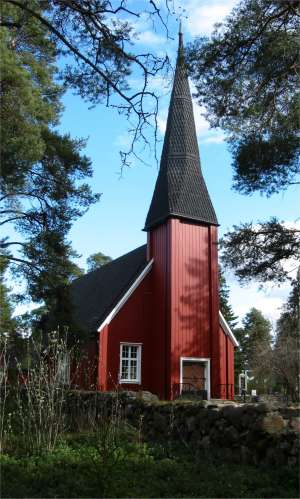
The old wooden church of Kempele was built between 1688 and 1691.

The old church of Kempele, which was built between 1688 and 1691, is one of the oldest wooden churches in Finland. Kempele was granted the right to build a prayer room in 1688, but parishioners decided to construct a church with a steeple. Given the custom of burying local notables under the church, there are about 150 graves in the crypt, the last of them dating from 1796. The church includes decorations by the noted Finnish painter Mikael Toppelius.

The old church ceased to be in active use after a new church was built next to it in the 1990s, but some events are still held in it from time to time.

Kempele may be best known for being the headquarters of the world-famous heart rate monitor corporation Polar Electro, which first brought the device to market in 1978.

== Sports ==
The men's pesäpallo club Kempeleen Kiri competes in the Superpesis national league, playing at Sarkkiranta Stadium.

== International relations ==
=== Twin towns — Sister cities ===
- Elva, Estonia

== See also ==
- Finnish regional road 816
- Oulunsalo
- Zeppelin (shopping centre)
