= Finnish regional road 816 =

Road in Finland

Regional Road 816
- Yhdystie 816 (Finnish); Förbindelseväg 816 (Swedish)
- Hailuoto Road: Hailuodontie; Karlövägen
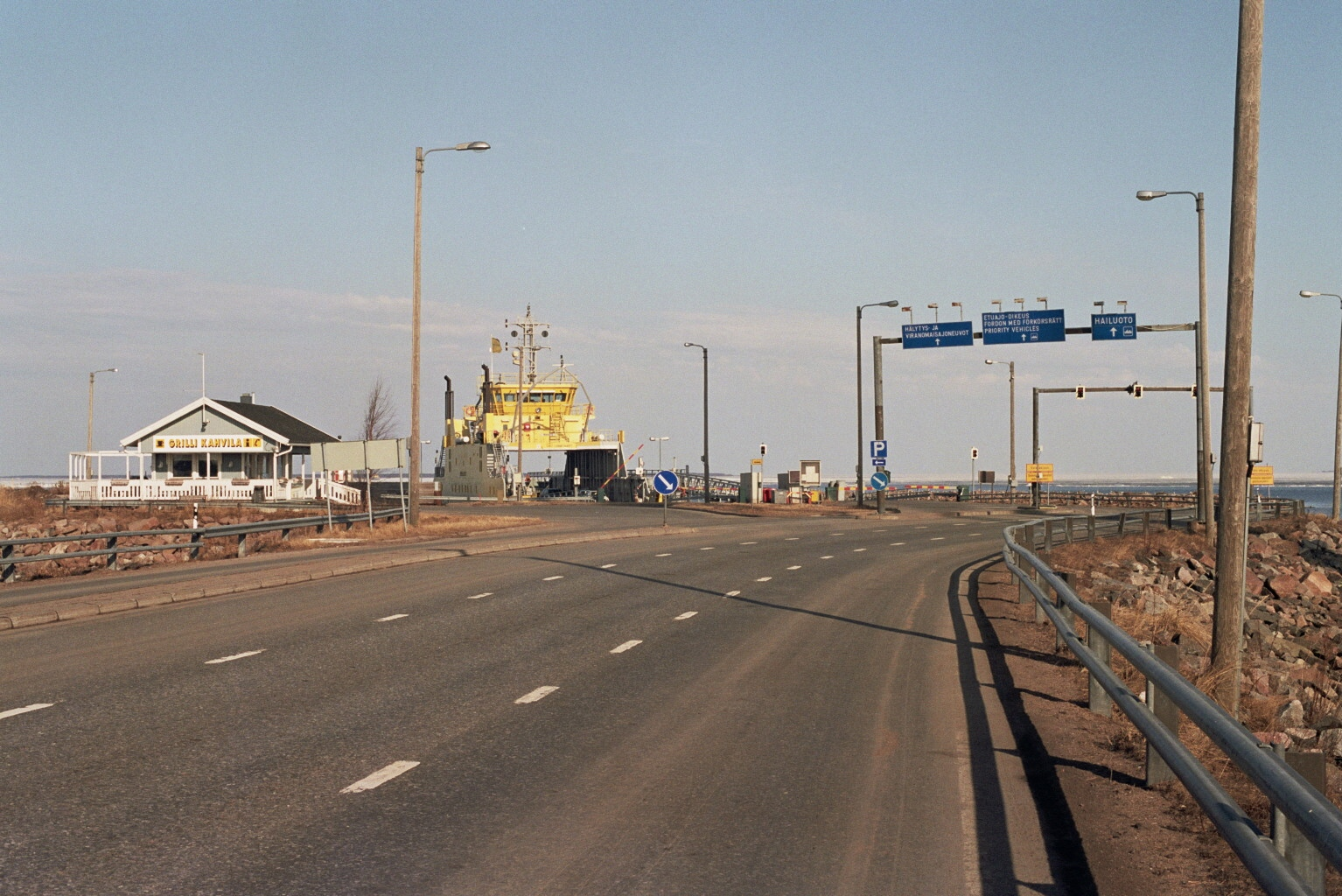
- Riutankari Harbor along the regional road in Oulunsalo, Oulu

Route information
- Length: 56 km (35 mi)

Major junctions
- From: Kempele
- To: Hailuoto

Location
- Country: Finland
- Major cities: Oulu (Oulunsalo)

Highway system
- Highways in Finland

Finnish regional road 816 (Finnish: Seututie 816; Swedish: Regionalväg 816), or Hailuoto Road (Finnish: Hailuodontie; Swedish: Karlövägen), is a Finnish road between the Kempele municipality and the Hailuoto Island. The length of the road is 56 kilometres (35 mi) which includes a 6.9-kilometre (4.3 mi) ferry connection between mainland and the Hailuoto Island.

The road starts at the roundabout in the center of Kempele, and passes the Oulunsalo district of Oulu to the shores of the Bothnian Bay to Riutunkari ferry port, from where the L/A Merisilta and L/A Meriluoto ferries run to Hailuoto to Huikku ferry port. From Huikku, the road continues through the villages of Ojakylä and Hailuoto to the Marjaniemi Lighthouse, which is located in the westernmost headland of the island. In winter, there is also an ice road between Riutunkari and Huikku. The road is the main traffic route in the Hailuoto municipality. In Hailuoto in particular, road traffic is cyclical due to ferry traffic; road traffic volumes in Hailuoto vary between 325 and 1,100 vehicles per day, while the number of ferry users is about 600 vehicles per day. In Hailuoto, the busiest section is the section between Ojakylä and Hailuoto church village. The average traffic on the road section between Ojakylä and the ferry beach is 584 vehicles per day. During the summer season, there is an increase of about 400 vehicles in daily traffic.

It crosses regional road 815, which runs between the city of Oulu and Oulu Airport. The road section from the Kempele roundabout to the Sarkkiranta roundabout is part of the Pohjalahti Coastal Road (Finnish: Pohjanlahden rantatie tourist road between Vehmaa and Tornio. The tourist road continues from the roundabout to the Piriläntie road.
