= Kiiminki Church =

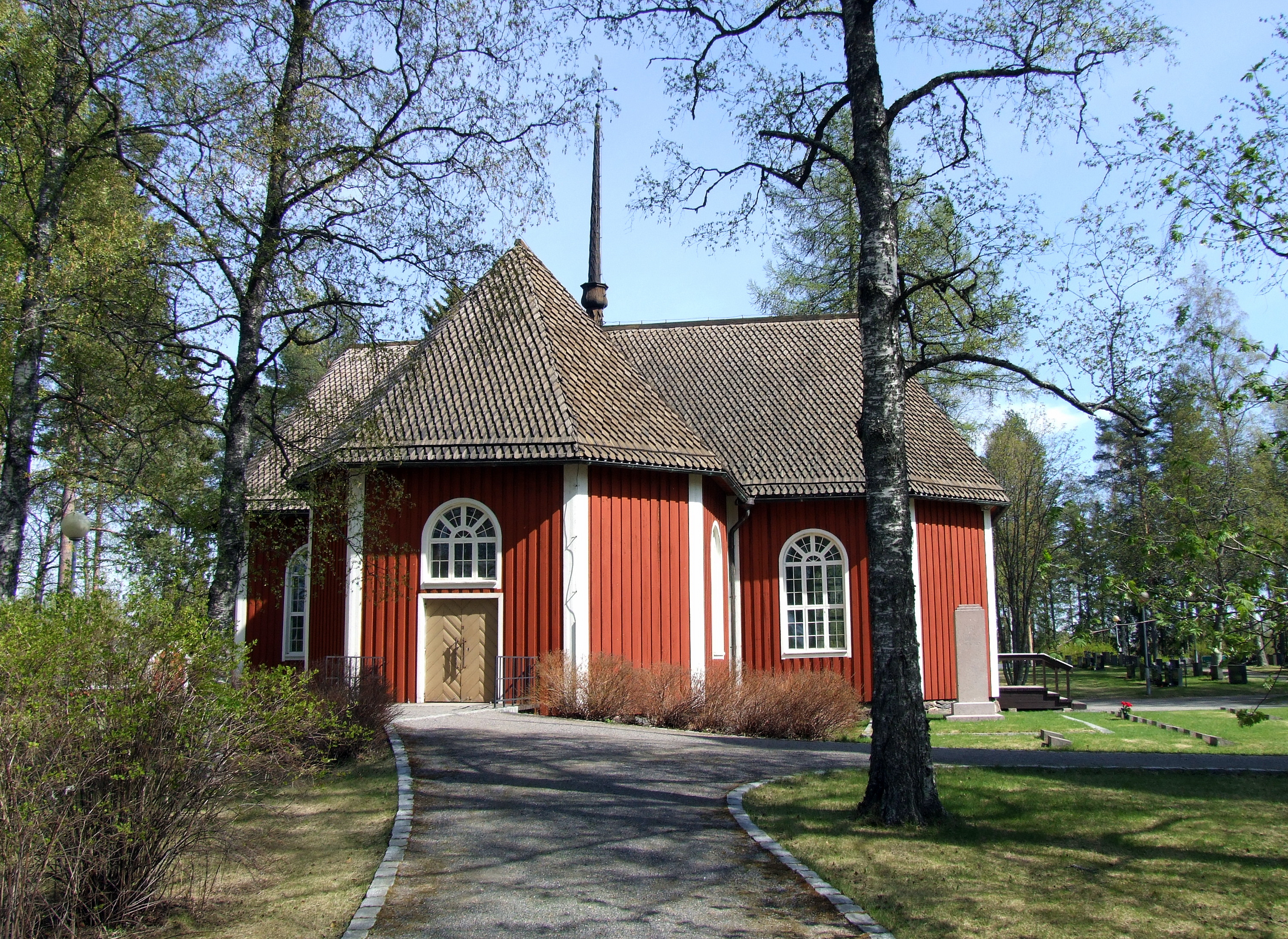
- Kiiminki Church
- 65°08′08″N 25°45′31″E
- Location: Oulu
- Country: Finland
- Denomination: Lutheran
- Website: http://www.oulunseurakunnat.fi/kiiminginkirkko

History
- Status: Church

Architecture
- Functional status: Active
- Architect: Matti Honka
- Completed: 1760

Administration
- Diocese: Diocese of Oulu
- Parish: Kiiminki parish

The Kiiminki Church (Finnish: Kiimingin kirkko, Swedish: Kiminge kyrka) is an evangelical Lutheran church in the Kiiminki district of the Finnish city of Oulu. It was part of the town of Kiiminki until 2013 when that town was merged into Oulu.

The church building has been designed and constructed by Matti Honka, an Ostrobothnian builder of churches in the 18th century. Kiiminki Church is typical for Honka as it is a cruciform church with its corners chamfered. The church was completed in 1760 and inaugurated on July 26, 1761. The wall behind altar has been painted by Mikael Toppelius in 1780s. Bell tower of the church has been built in 1777. Kiiminki Church is one of the best preserved 18th century wooden churches in Finland.
