= Yrjö Wichmann =

Finnish linguist

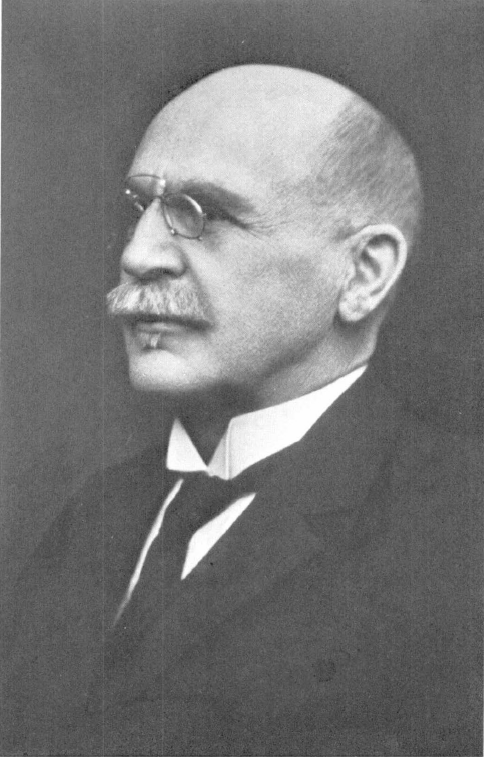
- Born: Yrjö Jooseppi Wichmann; 8 September 1868; Liminka, Grand Duchy of Finland, Russia
- Died: 3 May 1932 (aged 63); Helsinki, Finland
- Occupation: linguist

Signature
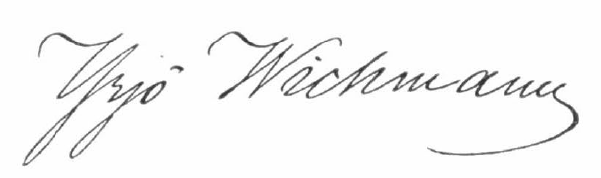

Yrjö Jooseppi Wichmann (8 September 1868 – 3 May 1932) was a Finnish linguist. He was a professor of Finno-Ugric language studies at the University of Helsinki in 1920–1932.

Wichmann's parents were Vicar Emil August Wichmann (1831–1886) and Charlotta Wilhelmina Schroderus (1841–1927). He graduated from the Oulun Lyseo Upper Secondary School in 1887 and then graduated with a bachelor's and master's degree in philosophy in 1891 and a licentiate and doctorate in 1897. Wichmann became a docent of Finno-Ugric language studies in the same year. He worked as a Finnish language teacher at the Helsinki School of Commerce in the years 1893–1897 and at the Swedish Graduate School in Helsinki 1897–1901, 1902–1905 and 1908–1922. Wichmann was also awarded an honorary doctorate at the University of Marburg in 1927.

In 1891–1892 and 1894, Wichmann studied the Udmurt language as a scholarship holder of the Finno-Ugrian Society. The topic of his thesis from 1897 was the vowel list of the first syllable of Udmurt compared to the representation of Komi. In his later travels, Wichmann also studied Komi, Mari and the language of the Csángó Hungarians living in Western Moldavia, Romania. Wichmann's dictionary of the Csángó dialect was published by Csűry Bálint and Artturi Kannisto in 1936.

Wichmann was married to Julia Maria Herrmann (1881–1974) since 1905. Their son was Väinö Vihma (1907–1958), professor of commercial law at Helsinki School of Economics.
