= Kierikki =

Archaeological site in Yli-Ii, Oulu, Finland

Coordinates: 65°21′39″N 25°56′13″E

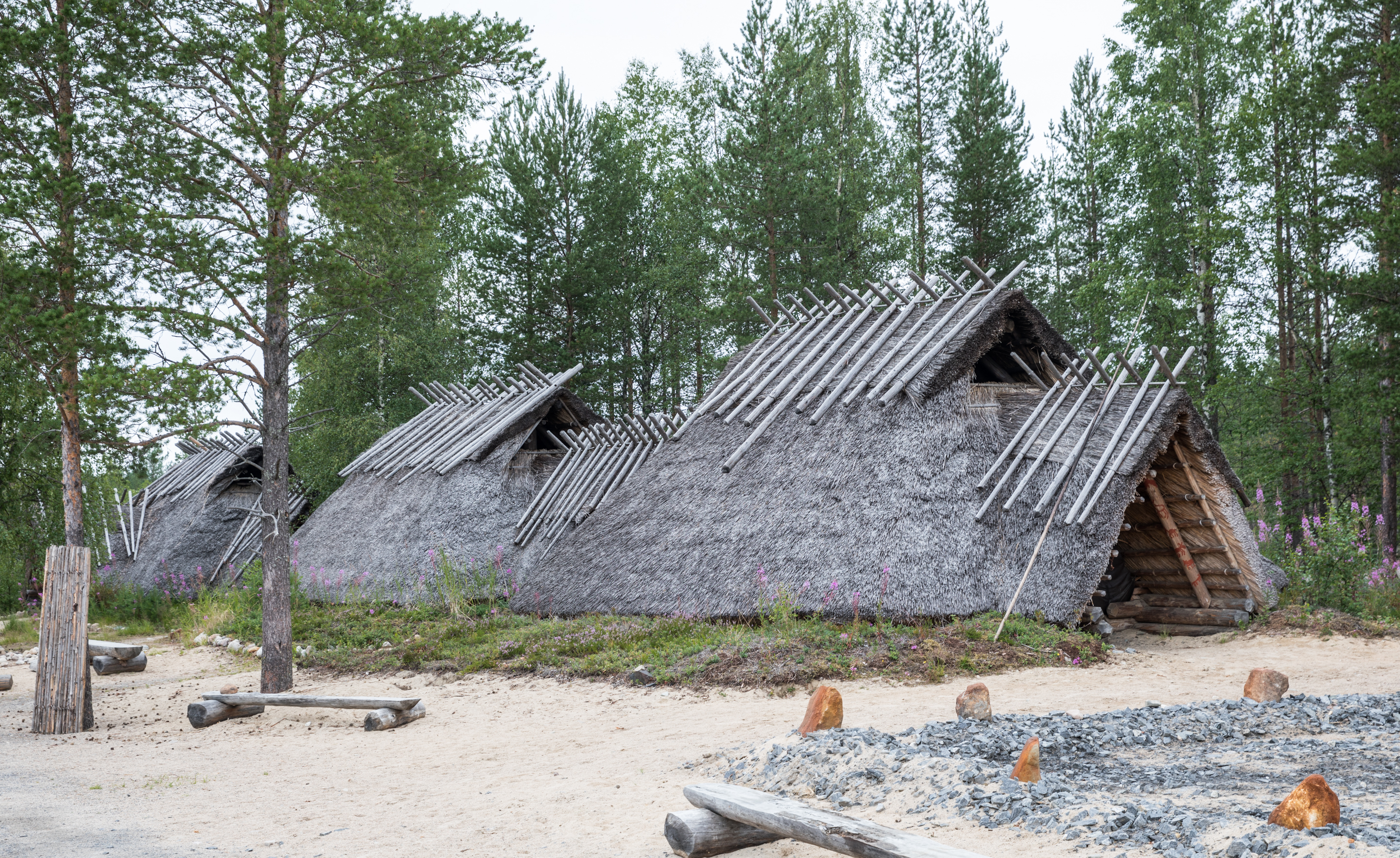
Reconstructions of Stone Age dwellings in Kierikki Centre, Oulu

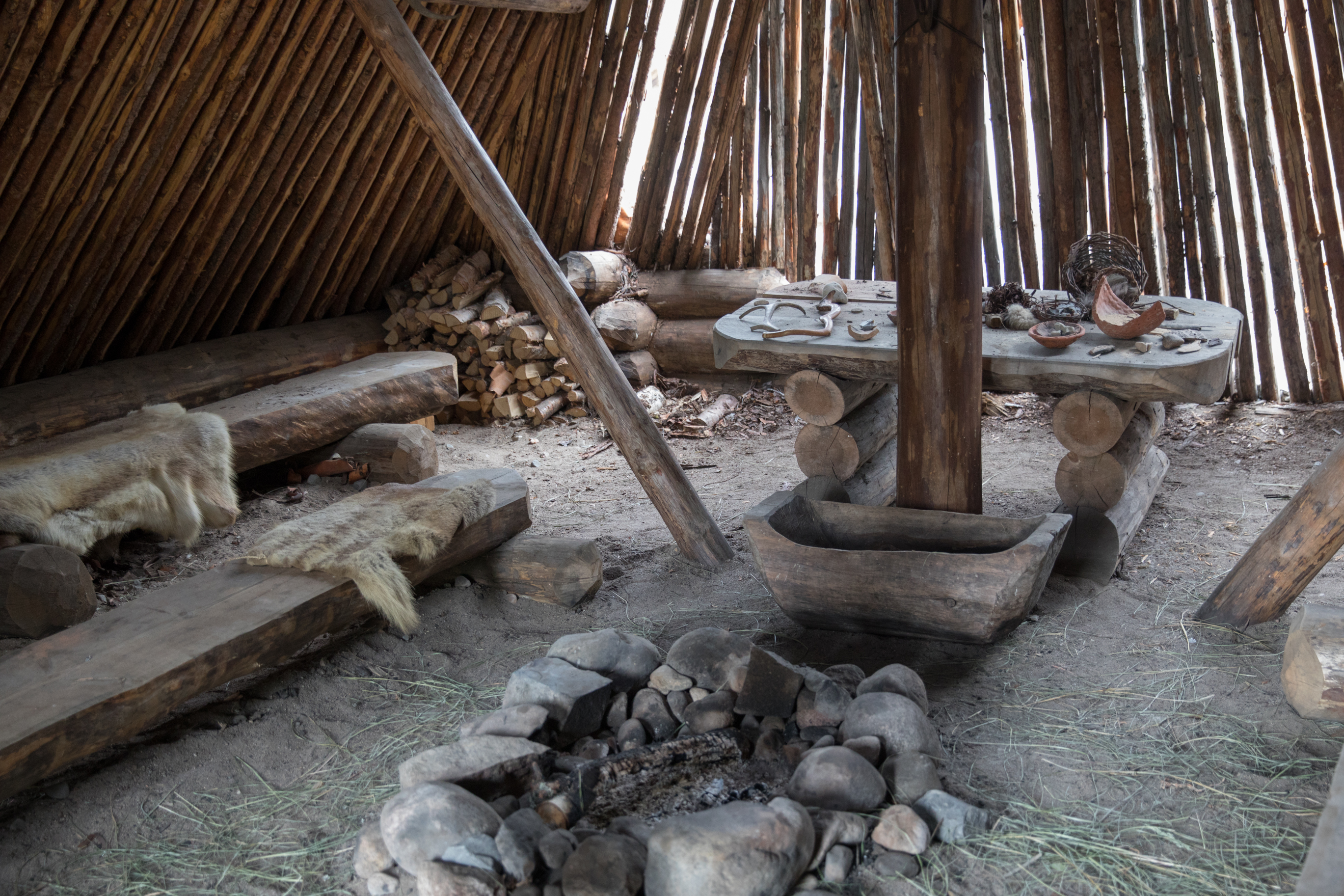
View from the inside

Kierikki is an area located in Yli-Ii by the Ii River in Finland. It is about ten kilometres southeast and towards Pudasjärvi from Yli-Ii's centre. Kierikki is also a surname in Finland which has come to be used after the Ii River’s rapid named Kierikki.

Kierikki is one of Finland's most important archaeological exploration locations. Excavations began around 1960 and are still ongoing. Research has significantly changed the view of northern Finland in Stone Age. Archaeologists used to think that people in Stone Age were nomads, people who change their residence along with the seasons. In fact, people lived in large villages the whole year. This was possible because of the massive fish and seal catches people got at the time. Fish and seal surpluses were also used in trade. Arrow heads made of flint were traded from Russia and amber ornaments from Baltic states.

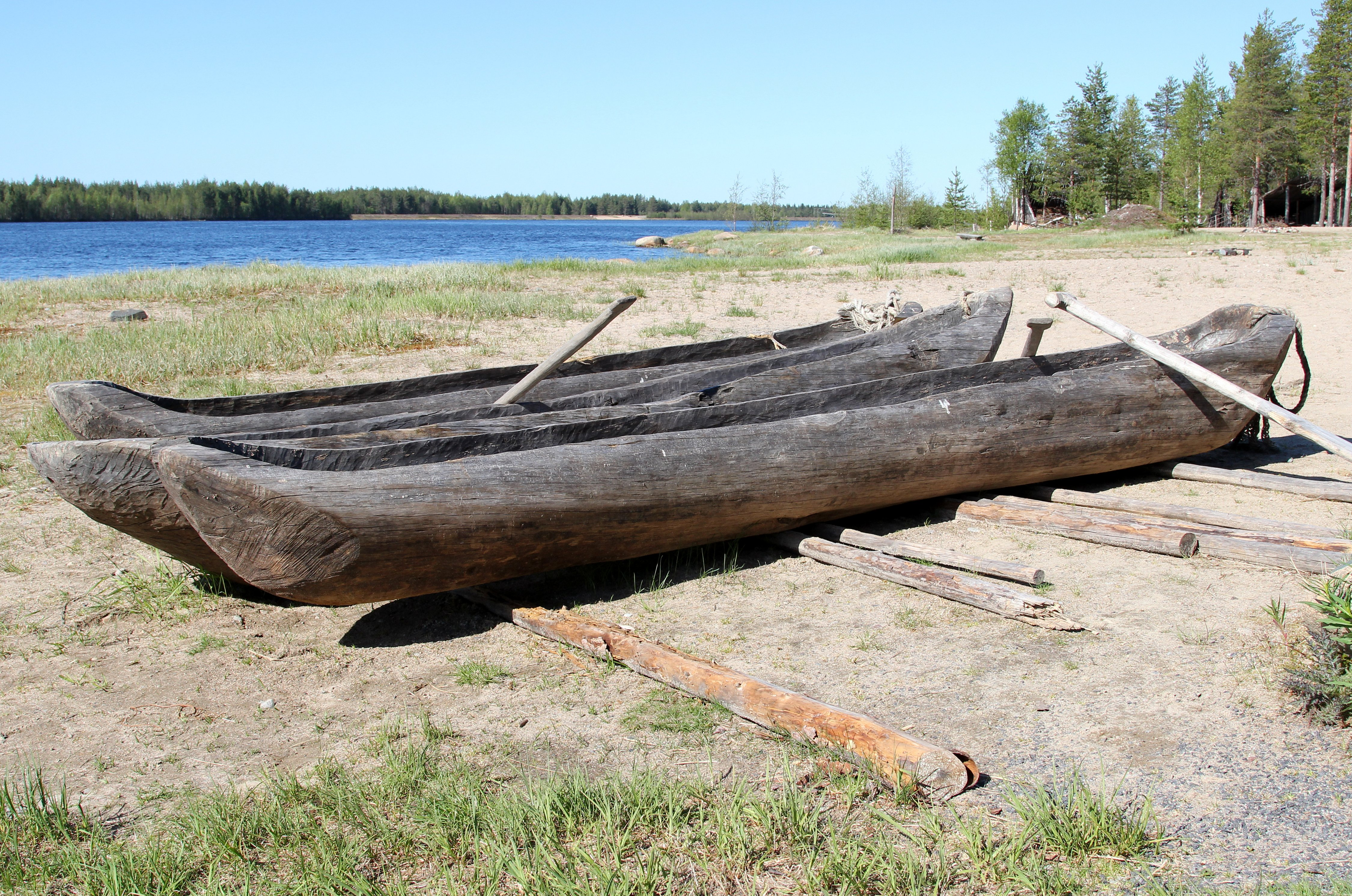
Dugout boats in Kierikki Centre, Oulu

Stone Age chewing gum made of birch bark was found in Kierikki’s excavations in the summer of 2007. The finding was reported by the BBC.

Kierikki is also a subdivision of late typical comb ceramics. Kierikki ceramics were used in 3500–3100 BC and it preceded another asbestos-ceramic type called pöljä. Finnish Comb Ceramic culture is called Neolithic because it is comparable to Neolithic cultures elsewhere. Besides ceramics, Finnish Comb Ceramic culture also includes polished weapons made of stone, which are a part of Neolithic cultures. One difference was the lack of agriculture in Finland in the Stone Age.

Kierikki includes Kierikki Stone Age Centre, which is a popular destination with its archaeological exhibitions and Stone Age villages. There is also a hotel in the area.

Every summer public excavations are arranged, where members of public can participate in work in Kierikki. In 2012, an eleven-year-old, Hedvig Hautala, found amber during one of these excavations.
