= Polar Electro =

Manufacturer of sports training devices

Polar

- Polar Electro headquarters in 2013
- Type: Private – Oy
- Industry: Sports instruments
- Founded: 1977; 49 years ago in Kempele, Finland
- Founder: Seppo Säynäjäkangas
- Headquarters: Kempele, Finland
- Area served: Worldwide
- Products: Heart rate monitors
- Number of employees: 1,200
- Website: www.polar.com

Polar Electro Oy (commonly known as Polar) is a Finnish manufacturer of sports training computers, particularly known for developing the world's first wireless heart rate monitor.

The company is based in Kempele, Finland and was founded in 1977. Polar has approximately 1,200 employees worldwide, it has 26 subsidiaries that supply over 35,000 retail outlets in more than 80 countries. Polar manufactures a range of heart rate monitoring devices, and accessories for athletic training and fitness and also to measure heart rate variability.

== History ==
=== Early devices (1975-2010) ===
In 1975, there was no accurate way to measure heart rate during training, and the idea of a wireless, portable heart rate monitor was conceived on a cross-country skiing track in Finland.

Polar was founded in 1977, and the company filed its first patent for wireless heart rate measurement three years later. Its founder Seppo Säynäjäkangas (1942–2018) was the inventor of the first wireless EKG heart rate monitor. In 1978, the company launched its first commercial product, the Tunturi Pulser. In 1982, Polar launched the world's first wearable wire-free heart rate monitor, the Sport Tester PE 2000.

=== New products (2011-2019) ===
In November 2015, Polar released its first optical wrist-reading heart rate monitor, the A360. The Polar H7, a chest strap heart monitor, was given a positive review in 2016 by PC Magazine, which praised the accuracy and features such as working underwater, but did note they cause chafing when used for extended periods, like a triathalon. The Polar H10 was also positively reviewed by PC Mag in 2017.

In July 2018, Dutch newspaper De Correspondent revealed that Polar's fitness app shows users on the map, making it possible to find out their real names, profession and home addresses. In response, Polar ended some of the online functionality of sharing routes on the map.

=== Recent developments (2020-2026) ===
While Polar Electro is an internationally recognized Finnish consumer electronics brand, its market position has become increasingly challenged, particularly in North America. The company's annual revenue was €170 million in 2020, then €112 million in 2022, when it had an operating loss of €31 million. The company's annual revenue in late 2023 was approximately €110 million. Despite maintaining substantial turnover, that year Polar reported a net loss of about €15 million. At the time, Talouselama attributed the drop in revenue to factors such as high inventory levels among retailers, increased global competition in wearable technology from brands such as Garmin, and weak consumer sentiment impacting the traditional heart rate monitor and sports watch segment.

In 2023, Polar Electro began licensing its technology to other companies, with its first arrangement with the Japanese company Casio.

Polar Electro partnered with Casio Computer on a smartwatch in 2023.

In 2024, Polar's CEO was Sander Werring. In 2024, the company filed a patent infringement lawsuit for alleged infringement of its US Patent 6,537,227, which describes a heart rate monitor worn on the chest, and a method for calculating energy expenditure. The Utah District Court sided with defendants Suunto, Amer Sports and Firstbeat Technologies, and in 2025 a US appeals court deemed Polar Electro's patent unenforceable. The ruling did not impact Polar's existing consumer devices. In January 2026, Polar and Motorola announced a partnership on a smart watch.

== Products ==
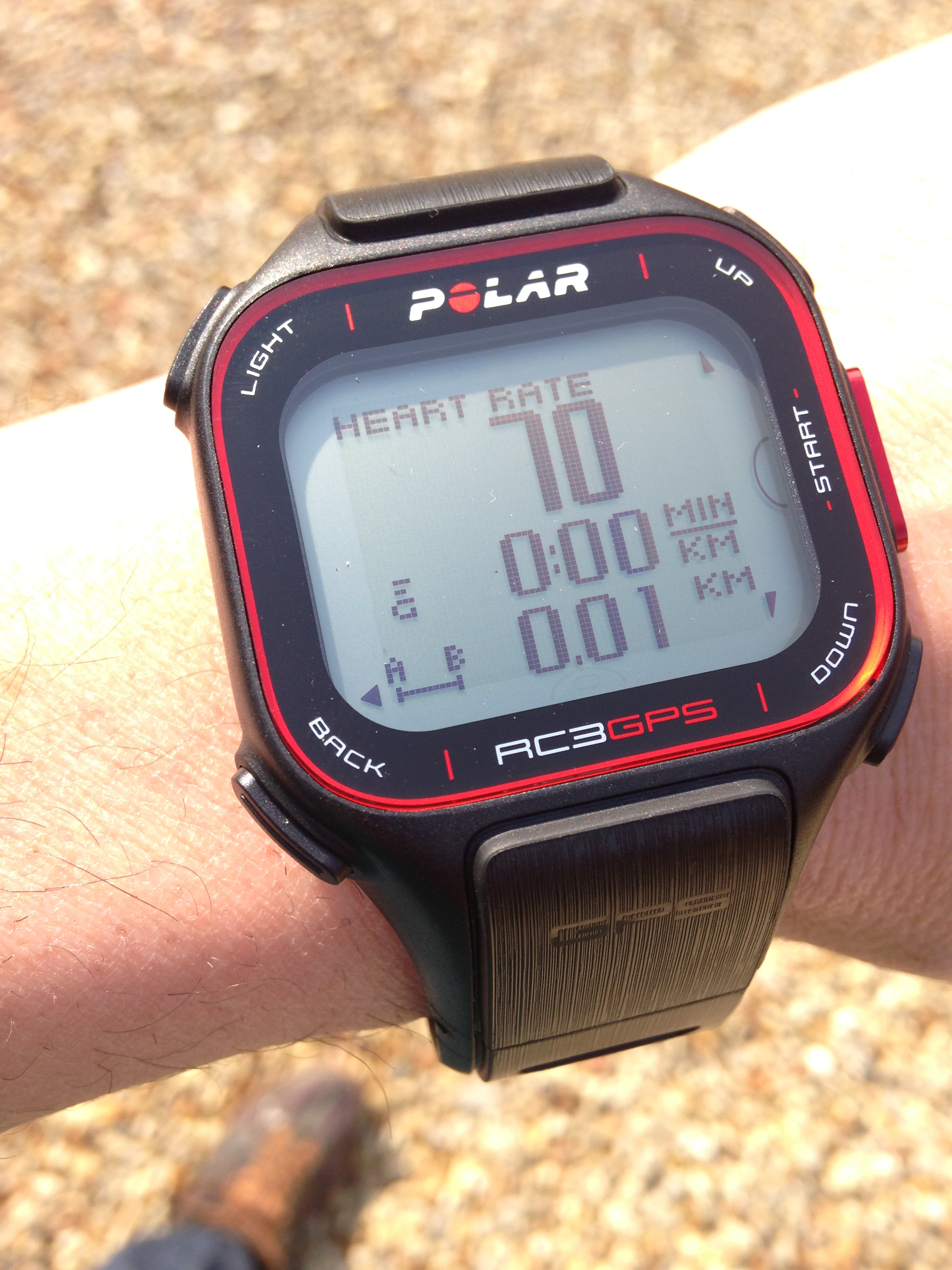
Polar RC3 heart rate monitor watch, pictured in 2013

Today, Polar has products ranging from basic models for beginners to fitness enthusiasts and training systems designed for elite athletes. Polar has also developed heart rate monitoring and training systems for equestrian sports. Polar technology and devices are widely used in various scientific studies, as well as being adopted by many university research departments. In part due to its own history, and the affiliation with universities and the scientific community, Polar offers a research co-operation programme focused on supporting studies in exercise science.

As of 2005, most of Polar Electro's heart monitors calculated calorie burn. As of 2016, among its products was the Polar M450 cycling computer, which used Bluetooth to pair to a heart-rate strap. In 2021, among Polar Electro's products were the Polar Ignite 2 smartwatch, which synced with Polar Flow, a multi-platform app that stores fitness data. In September 2025, Polar launched a screenless band without subscription.

=== Current products ===
As of March 2026

Model	Category	Announcement date
Polar 360	wearable band	2024-12-11
Polar Grit X2	watch	2025-06-04
Polar Grit X2 Pro	watch	2024-03-20
Polar H9	heart rate sensor	2020-01-29
Polar H10	heart rate sensor	2017-03-15
Polar Ignite 2	watch	2021-03-24
Polar Ignite 3	watch	2022-11-09
Polar Ignite 3 Titanium	watch	2023-06-14
Polar Loop (Gen 2)	wearable band	2025-09-03
Polar OH1+	heart rate sensor	2019-04-09
Polar Pacer	watch	2022-04-13
Polar Pacer Pro	watch	2022-04-13
Polar Street X	watch	2026-03-25
Polar Unite	watch	2020-06-30
Polar Vantage V3	watch	2023-10-11
Polar Vantage M3	watch	2024-10-23
Polar Verity Sense	heart rate sensor	2021-02-10

=== Discontinued products ===
As of March 2026

Model	Category	Announcement date
Polar Grit X	watch	2020-04-24
Polar Grit X Pro	watch	2021-10-06
Polar Ignite	watch	2019-06-26
Polar Vantage M	watch	2018-09-13
Polar Vantage M2	watch	2021-03-24
Polar Vantage V	watch	2018-09-13
Polar Vantage V2	watch	2020-10-07
Polar M460	bike computer	2017-04-12

== See also ==
- List of Finnish companies
