= Koitelinkoski =

Coordinates: 65°05′58″N 025°48′56″E

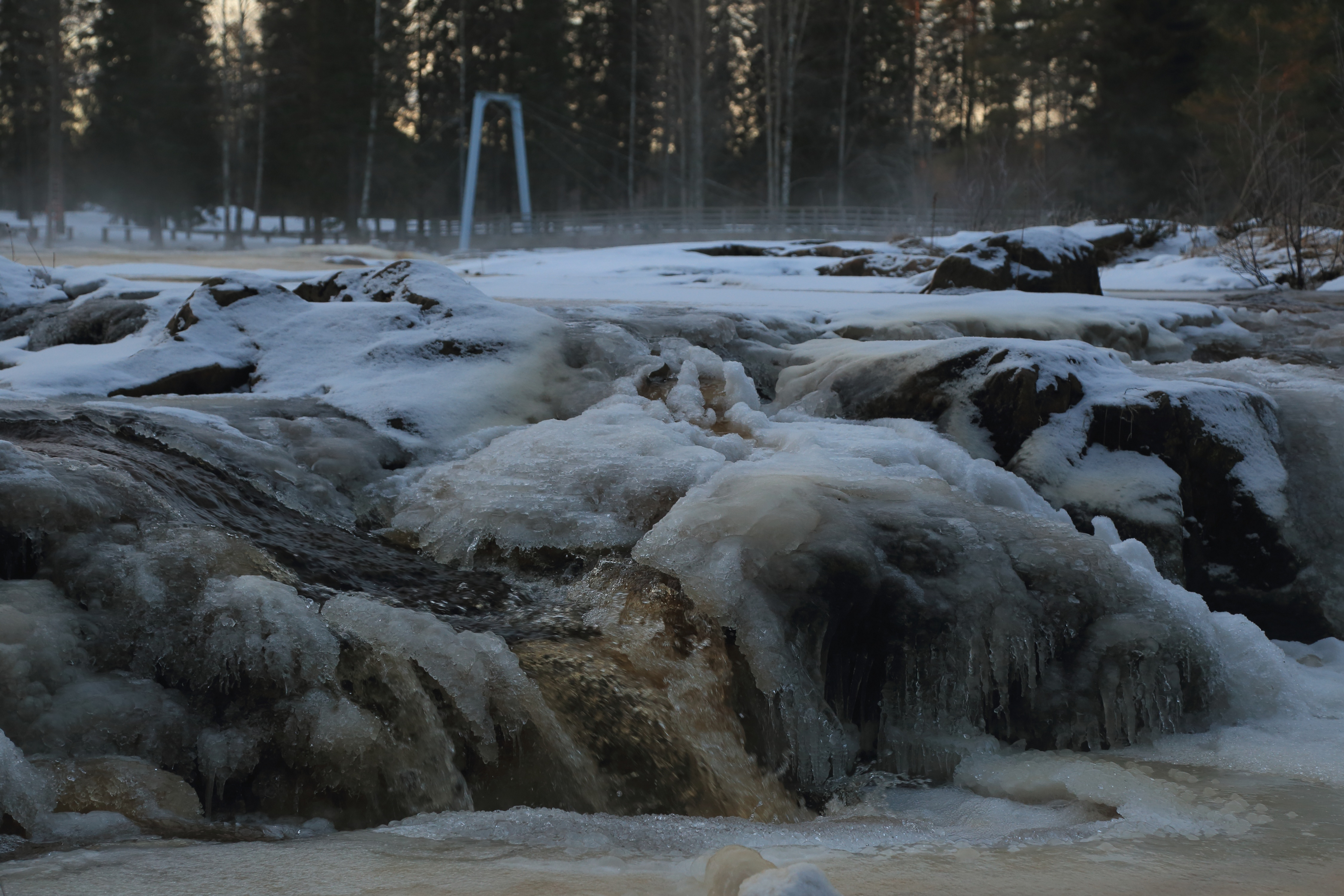
The rapids in the winter.

Koitelinkoski (i.e. Koiteli rapids) is an outdoor recreation area located along the Kiiminkijoki river in the Kiiminki district in Oulu, Finland. The area consists of small islands which divide the free-flowing river into smaller streams and rapids. The Koitelinkoski rapids stretch about three kilometers on the river. The rapids are one of the most impressive ones on the Kiiminkijoki river.

The larger islands are connected with suspension bridges. There is a summer café and an event stage on the largest, Sahasaari, island. There are several campfire sites scattered on the islands.

== Gallery ==
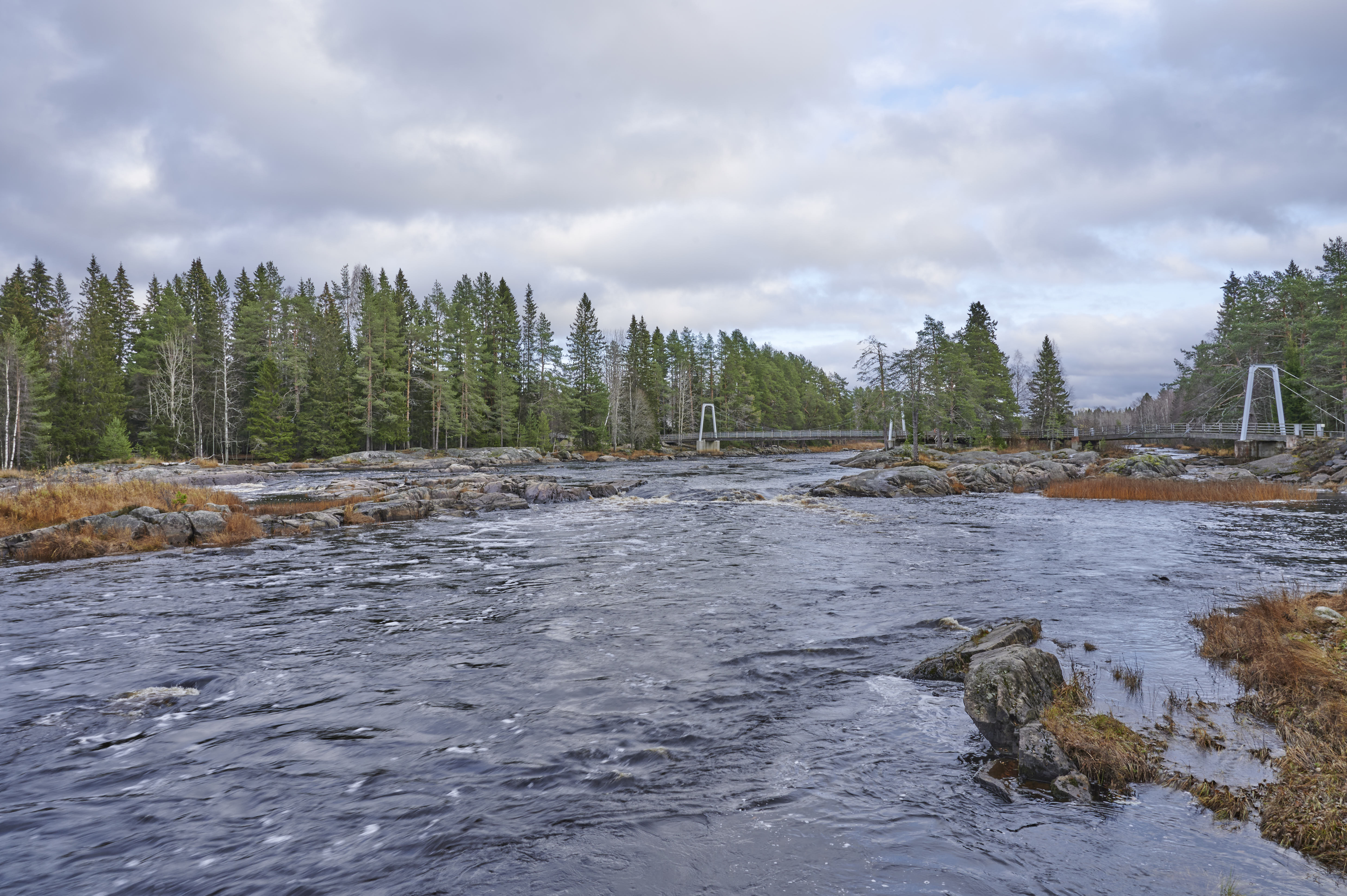
Koiteli rapids and the pedestrian bridge
