= Osmo Jussila =

Finnish historian (1938–2019)

Osmo Tapio Jussila (14 March 1938 in Haukipudas – 15 March 2019), was a Finnish historian.

Jussila was 1980-83 assistant professor in political history at Helsinki University and professor 1983-2001. He had in his research treated foremost the Finland–Russia relations. Suomen tie 1944-1948 is a research about the acts of the Finnish communist party after the second world war.

== Publications ==
- Nationalismi ja vallankumous venäläis-suomalaisissa suhteissa 1899-1914 (1979)
- Terijoen hallitus 1939-40 (1985)
- Suomen tie 1944-1948 (1990)
