= Antti Ylönen =

Finnish ice hockey player

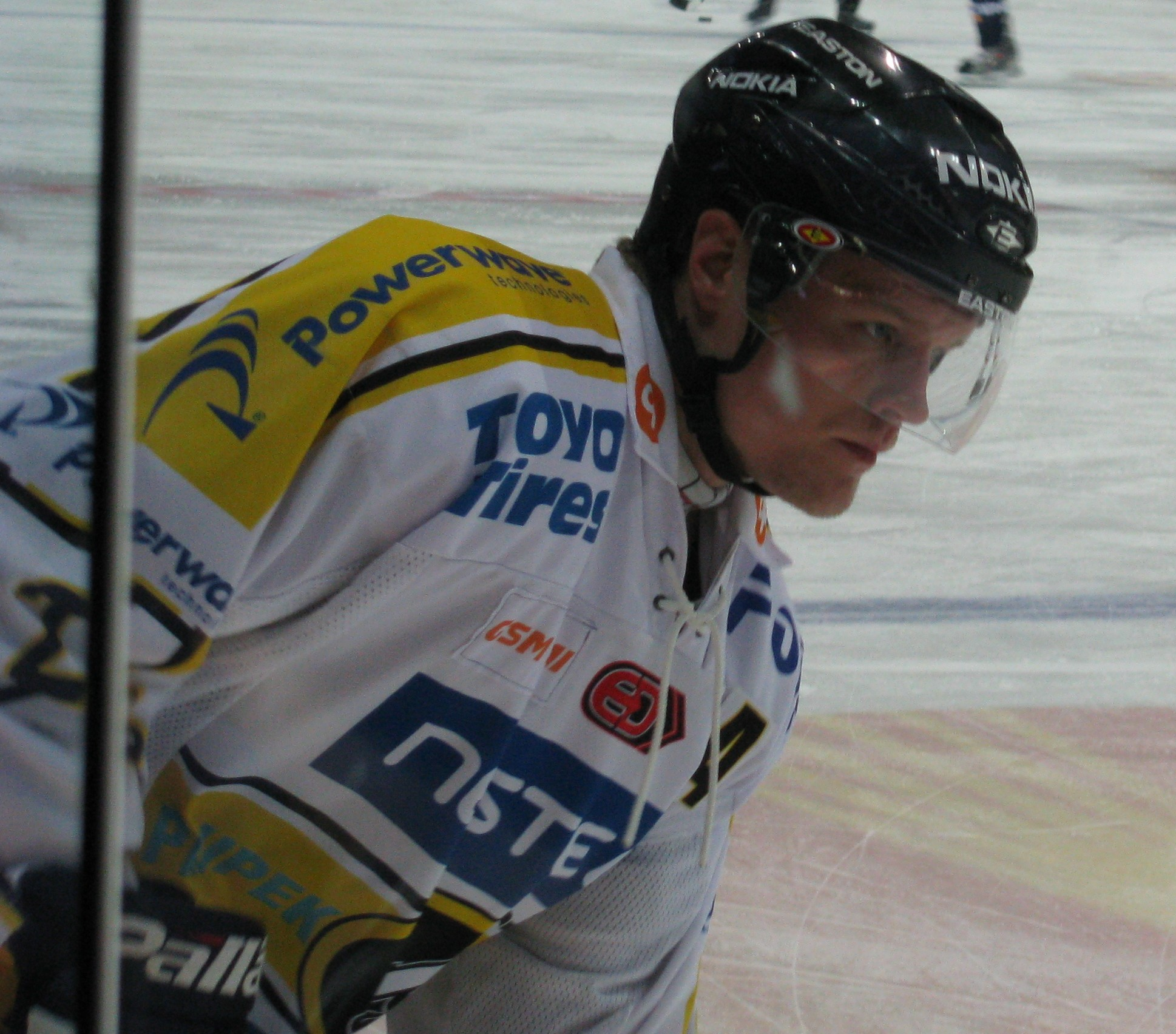
- Born: September 15, 1983 (age 41); Liminka, Finland
- Height: 5 ft 8 in (173 cm)
- Weight: 182 lb (83 kg; 13 st 0 lb)
- Position: Defence
- Shoots: Left
- SM-liiga team: Lahti Pelicans
- NHL draft: Undrafted
- Playing career: 2002–present

Antti Ylönen (born September 15, 1983) is a Finnish ice hockey defenceman currently playing for Lahti Pelicans of the SM-liiga. He has won three SM-liiga championships (2005, 2007, 2008) and one B-junior championship (2000), all in Oulun Kärpät.
