= Haukipudas =

- Municipality
- Haukiputaan kunta Haukipudas kommun
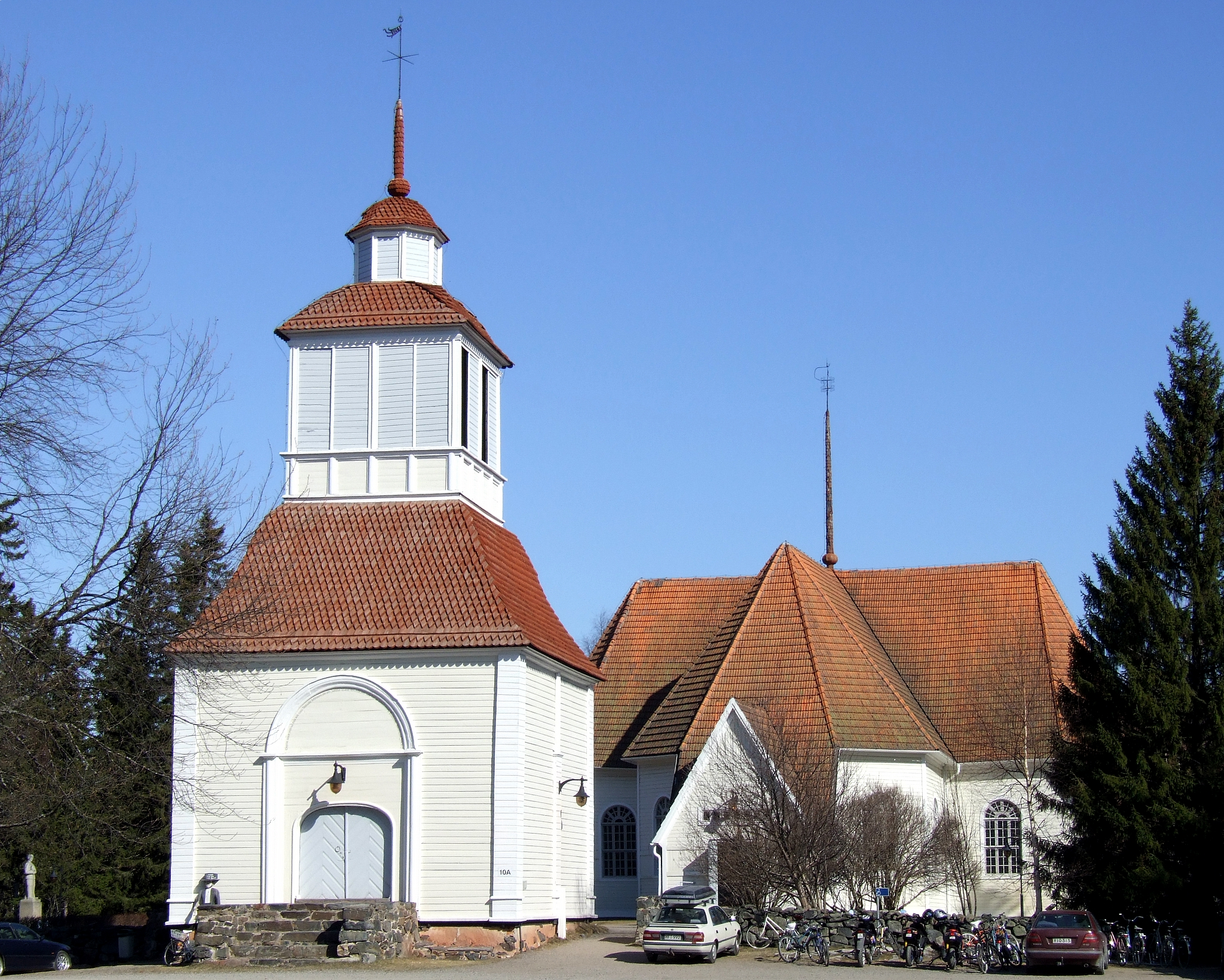
- The church and the belfry of Haukipudas

- Coat of arms

- Location of Haukipudas in Finland
- Coordinates: 65°11′N 025°21′E
- Country: Finland
- Region: North Ostrobothnia
- Sub-region: Oulu sub-region
- Charter: 1866

Government
  - Municipality manager: Jarmo Ronkainen

Area
  - Total: 1,023.62 km^{2} (395.22 sq mi)
  - Land: 798.67 km^{2} (308.37 sq mi)
  - Water: 224.95 km^{2} (86.85 sq mi)

Population (2012)
  - Total: 19,053
  - Density: 23.856/km^{2} (61.787/sq mi)
- Time zone: UTC+2 (EET)
  - Summer (DST): UTC+3 (EEST)
- Website: www.haukipudas.fi

Haukipudas is a town and former municipality of Finland. It was located in the province of Oulu and is part of the North Ostrobothnia region. Its shore runs along the Gulf of Bothnia, with the river Kiiminkijoki running through the province. Along with Kiiminki, Oulunsalo and Yli-Ii municipalities it was merged with the city of Oulu on 1 January 2013.

The municipality had a population of 19,053 (31 December 2012) and covered an area of 1,023.62 km^{2} (395.22 sq mi) of which 224.95 km^{2} (86.85 sq mi) is water. The population density is 23.8559/km^{2} (61.7865/sq mi).

The municipality was unilingually Finnish.

There were 16 villages in Haukipudas: Kirkonkylä, Santaholma, Ukonkaivos, Martinniemi, Asemakylä, Onkamo, Halosenniemi, Holstinmäki, Häyrysenniemi, Jokikylä, Kalimeenkylä, Kello, Kiviniemi, Parkumäki, Takkuranta and Virpiniemi.

The educational department took part in Lifelong Learning Programme 2007–2013 in Finland.

== Local sights ==
- Haukipudas Church, built in 1762.
- Kiviniemi, a fishing village
- Kurtinhaudan beach-forest
- Haukiputaan homestead

== Islands located off the Gulf of Bothnia ==
The following is a compilation of some of the islands of Haukipudas located just off the coast of the Gulf of Bothnia:

Hanhikari, Hietakari, Hoikka-Hiue, Iso-Hiue, Iso-Miehikkä, Isonkivenletto, Kaasamatala (Hiuvet), Kattilankalla, Kellon Kraaseli, Kintasletto, Kotakari, Kriisinkivi, Kropsu, Laitakari, Lemmonletto, Länsiletto, Lönkytin, Mustakari, Mustakari (Martinniemi), Nimetön, Pallonen, Pensaskari, Pikku-Miehikkä, Pulkkisenmatala, Puukkoletto, Rapakari, Rivinletto (Kaasamatala), Santapankki, Satakarinletto, Ulko-Pallonen, Välikari, Ykskivi, Väliletto, Äijänkumpele.

== Notable individuals ==
- Topias "Topson" Taavitsainen, professional Dota 2 esports player
- Tytti Isohookana-Asunmaa, Minister and Member of Parliament (Centre Party)
- Osmo Jussila, political historian
- Merja Larivaara, actor
- Lea Laven, entertainer and singer
- Yrjö Murto, Minister and Member of Parliament (Finnish People's Democratic League)
- Sakari Manninen, ice hockey player
- Sakari Pietilä, ice hockey player
- Lasse Pirjetä, ice hockey player
- Samuli Pohjamo, Member of the European Parliament
- Jukka Poika, singer
- Jukka Rasila, actor
- Riitta-Liisa Roponen, cross-country skier
- Eero Tapio, Olympic wrestler
- Mirja Vehkaperä, Member of Parliament (Centre Party)
- Helena Benaouda, head of Muslim Council of Sweden

== Haukipudas photo gallery ==
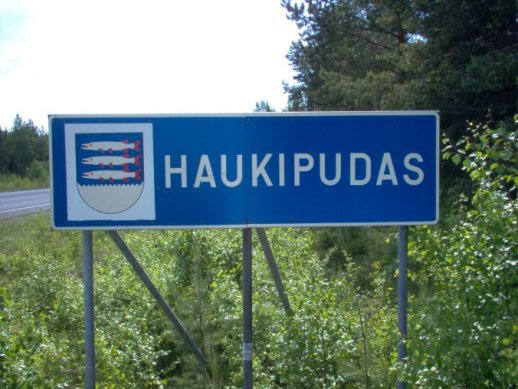
Municipal border sign

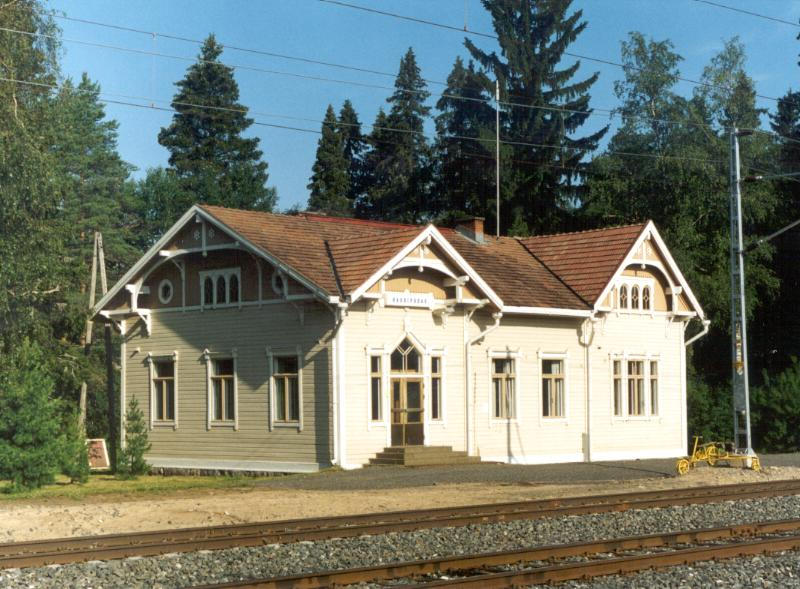
Haukipudas railway station

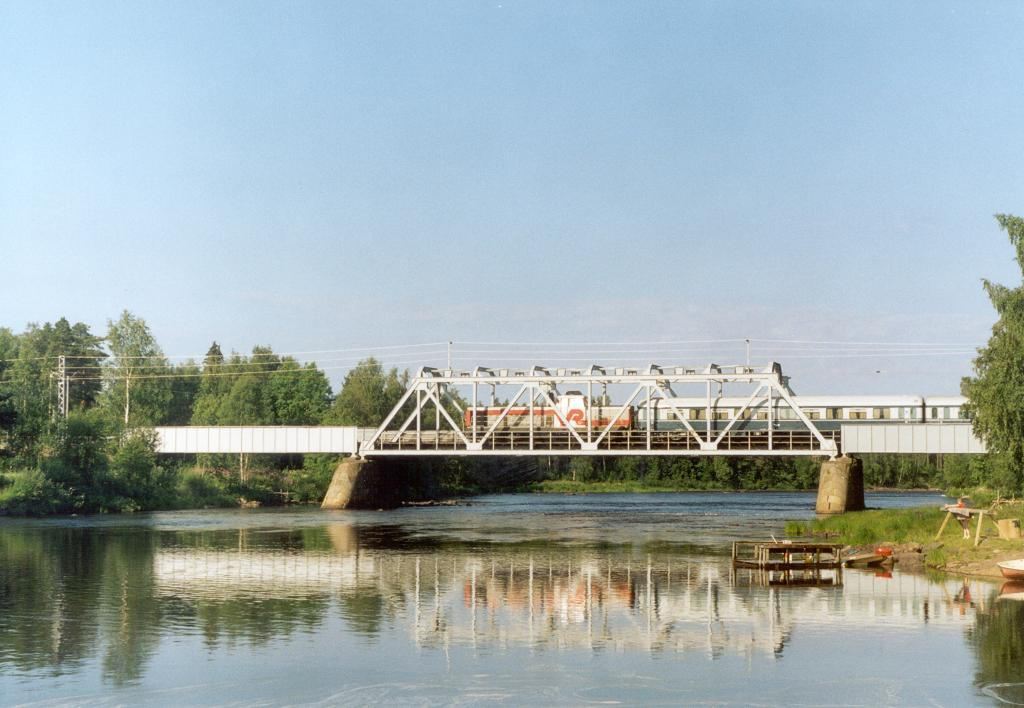
Kiiminki River railway bridge

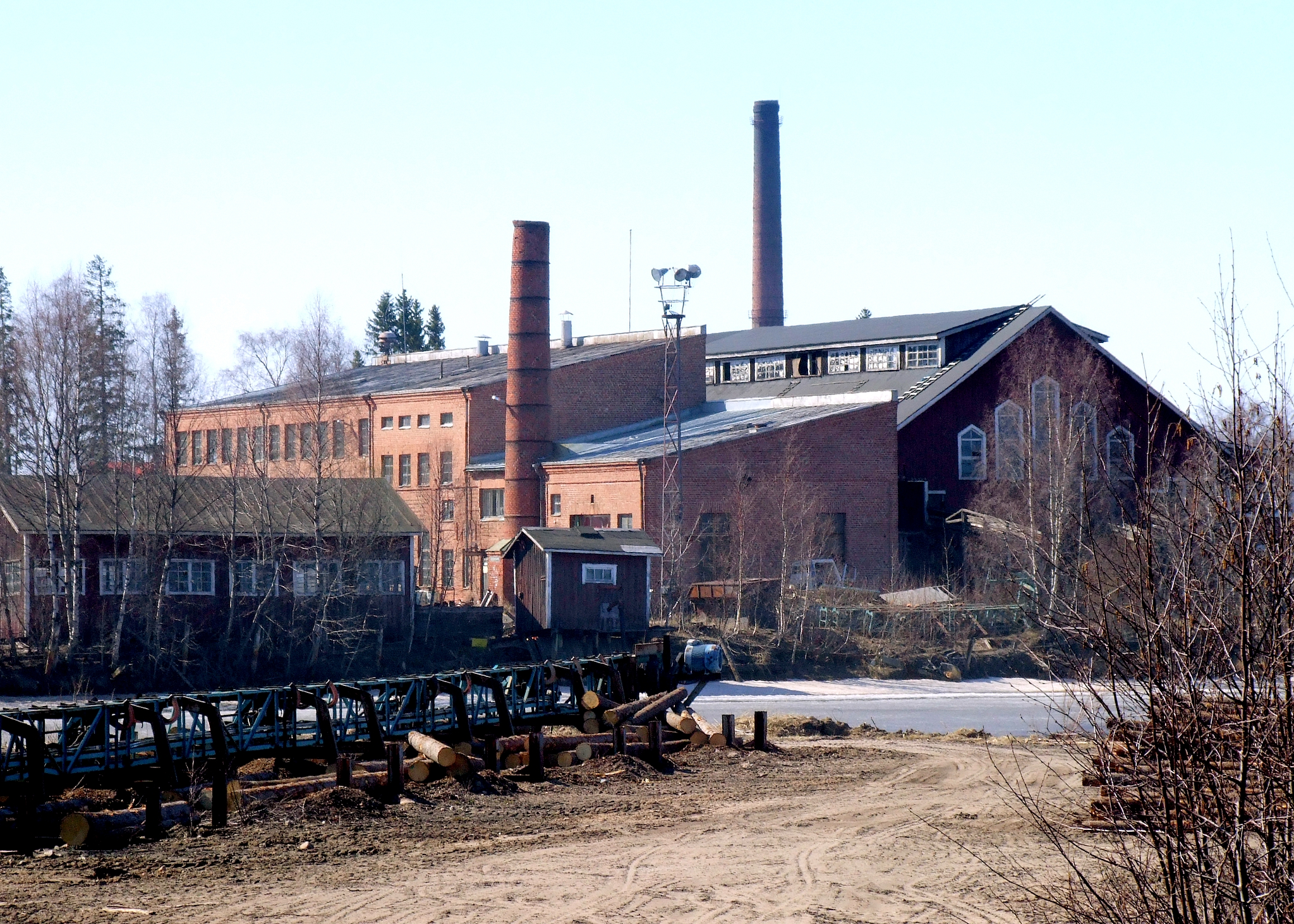
Martinniemi sawmill

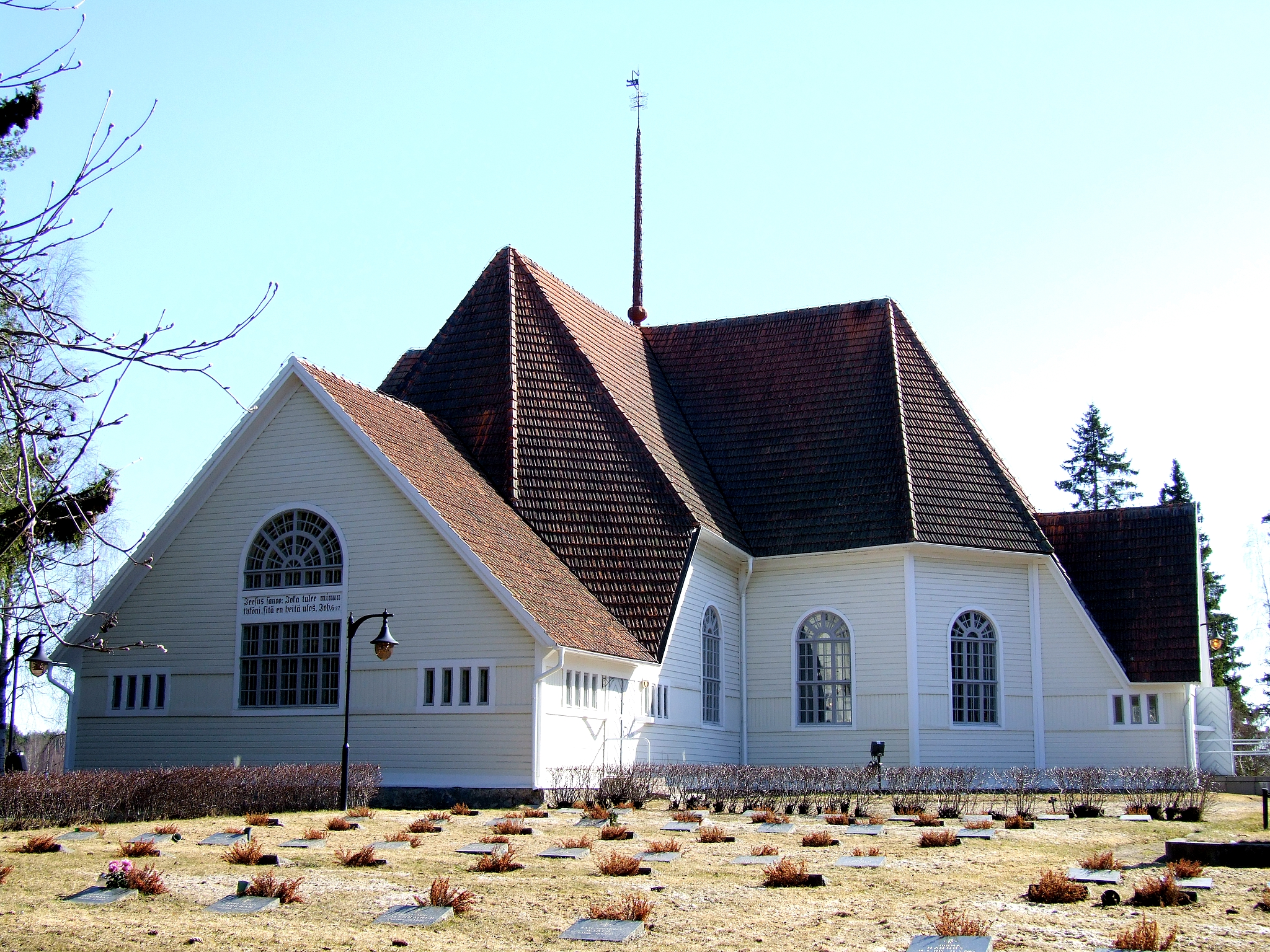
Haukipudas Church

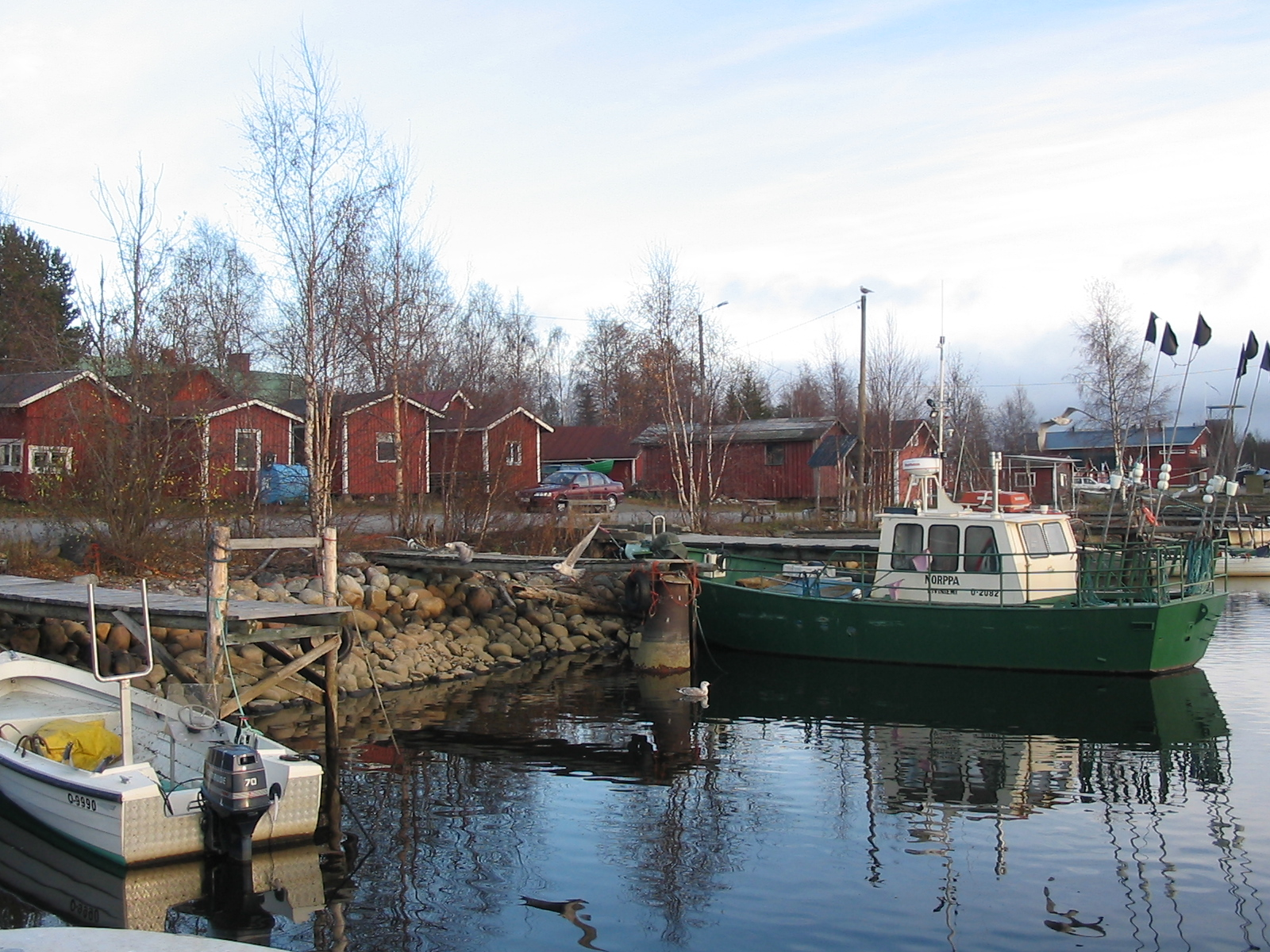
Kiviniemi fishing village

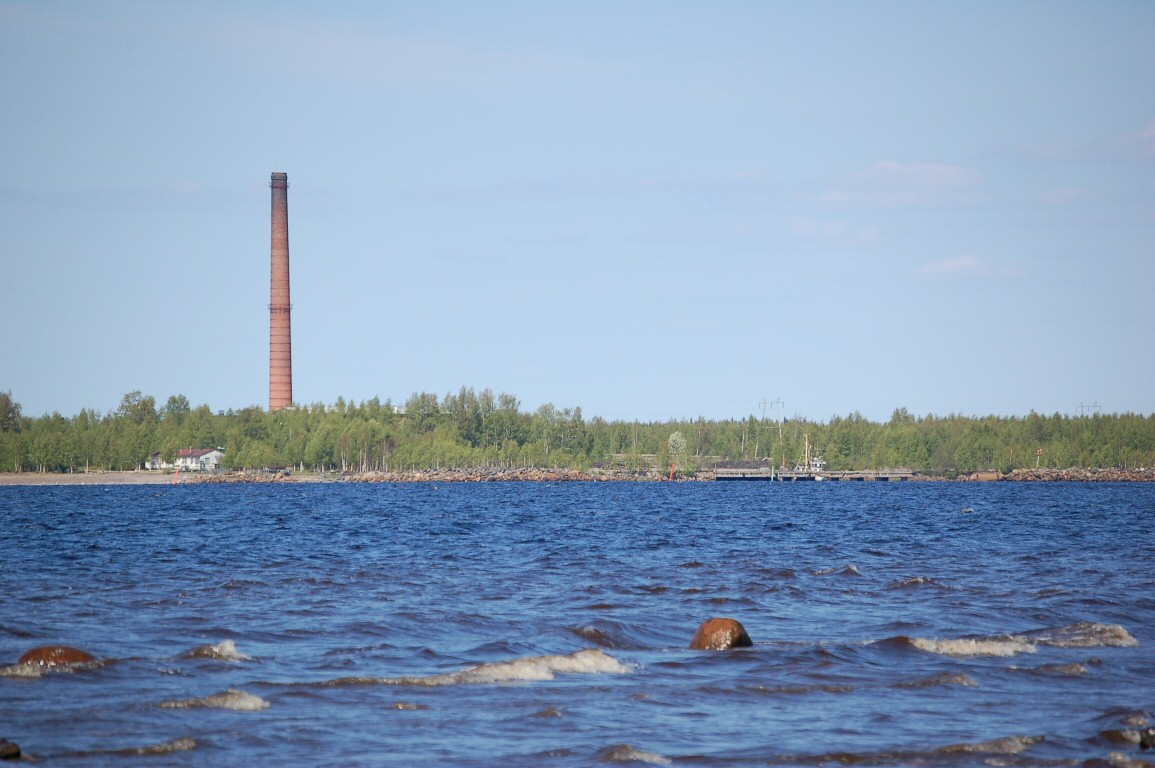
Island of Laitakari

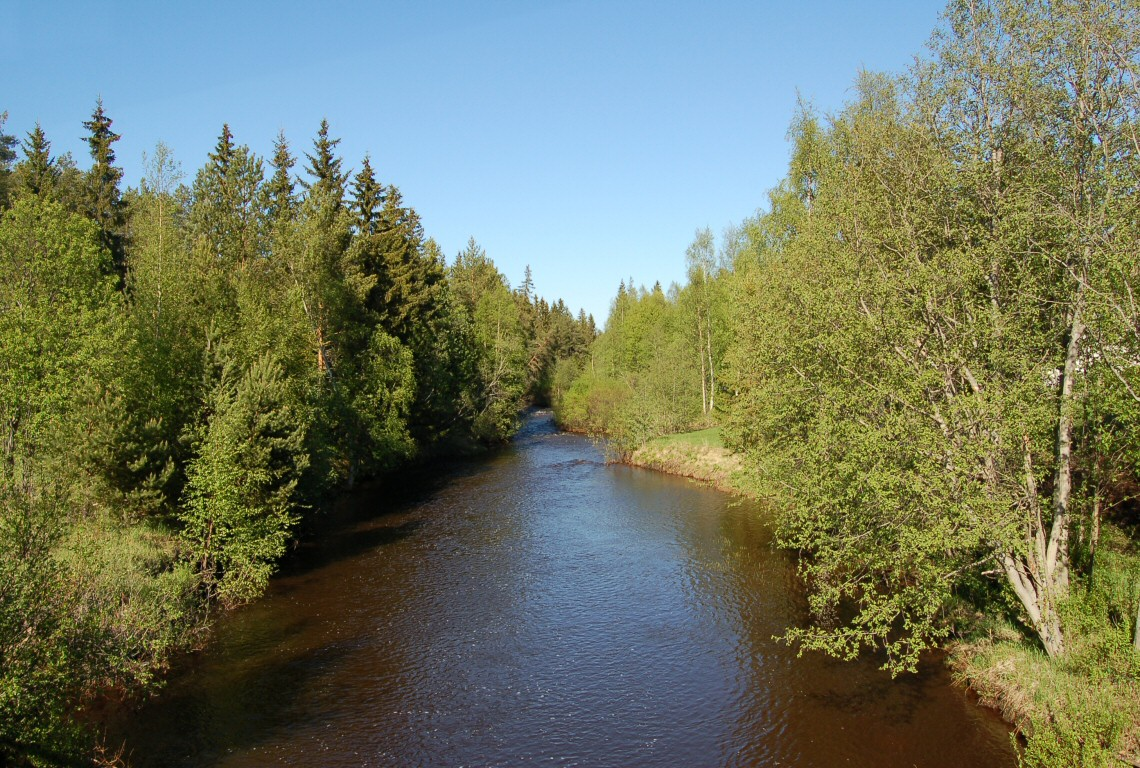
Kalimeenoja creek

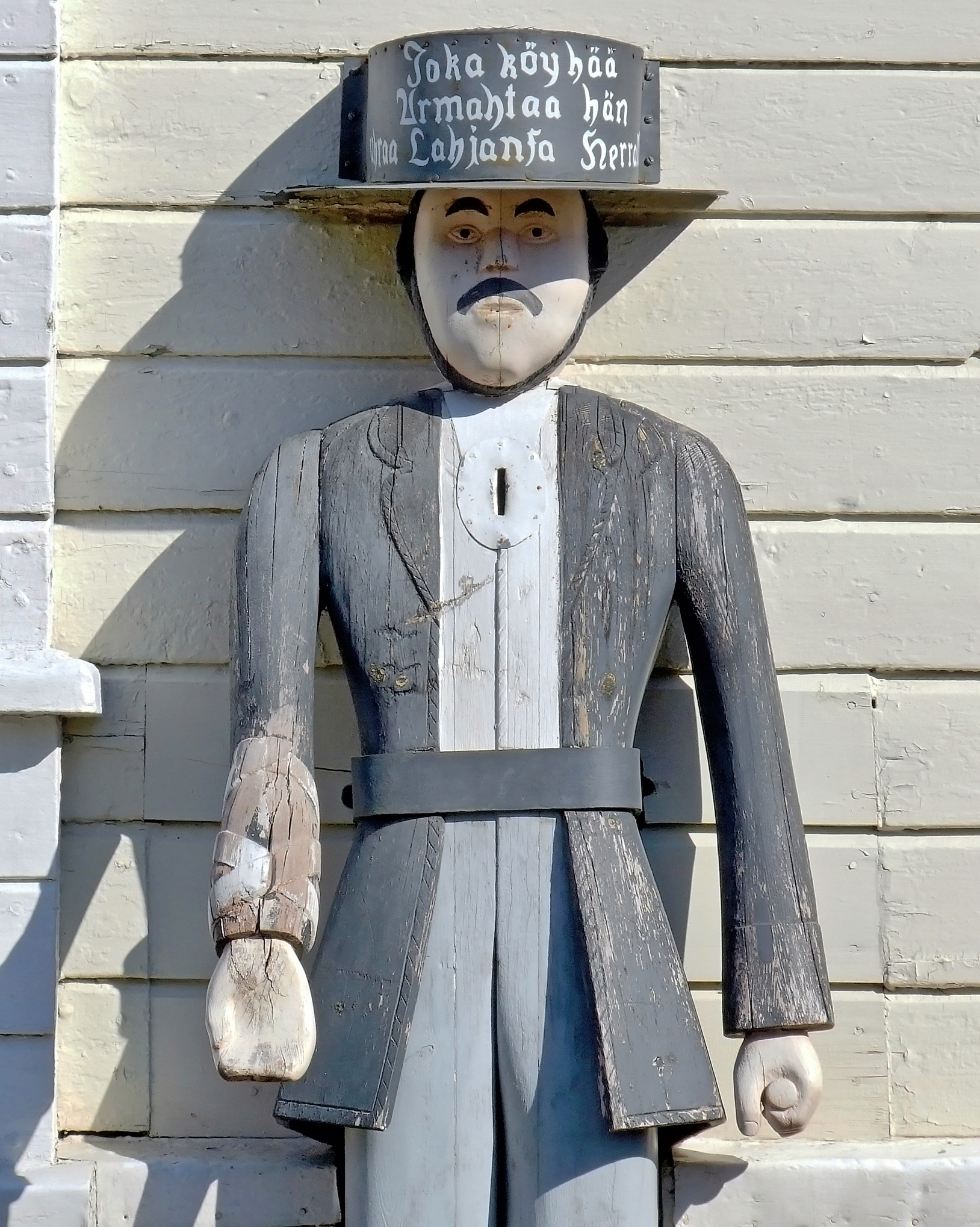
The wooden poorboy (vaivaisukko in Finnish) by the Belfry of Haukipudas Church.

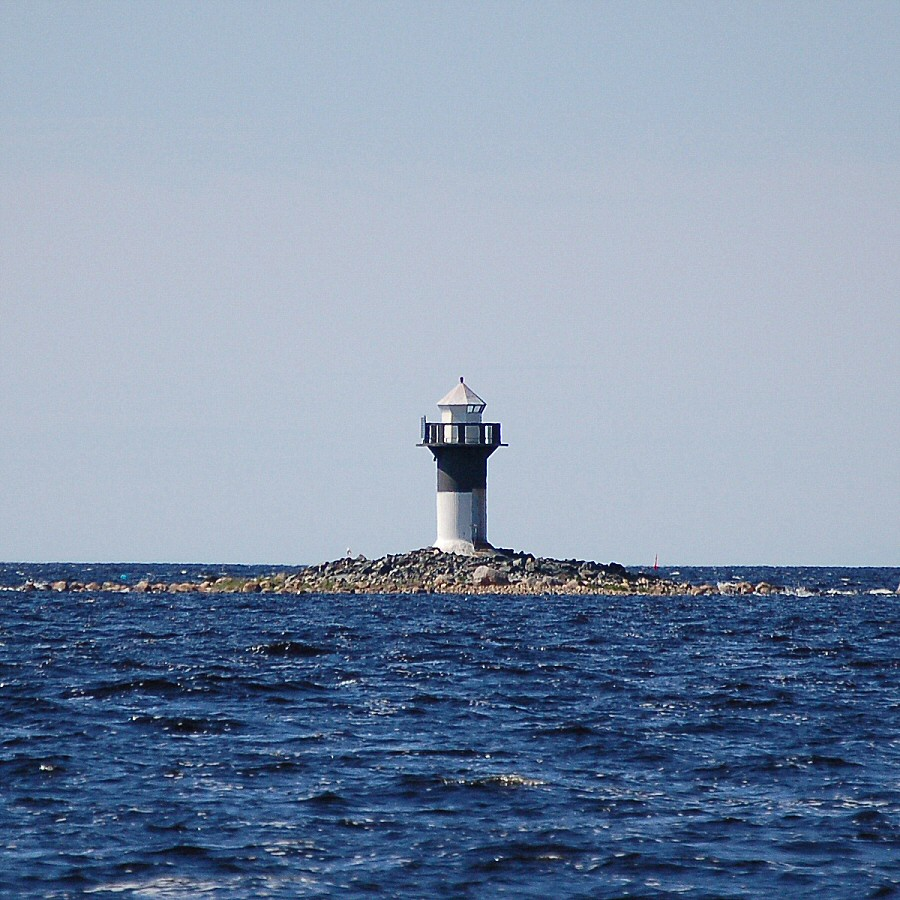
Rivinletto Light

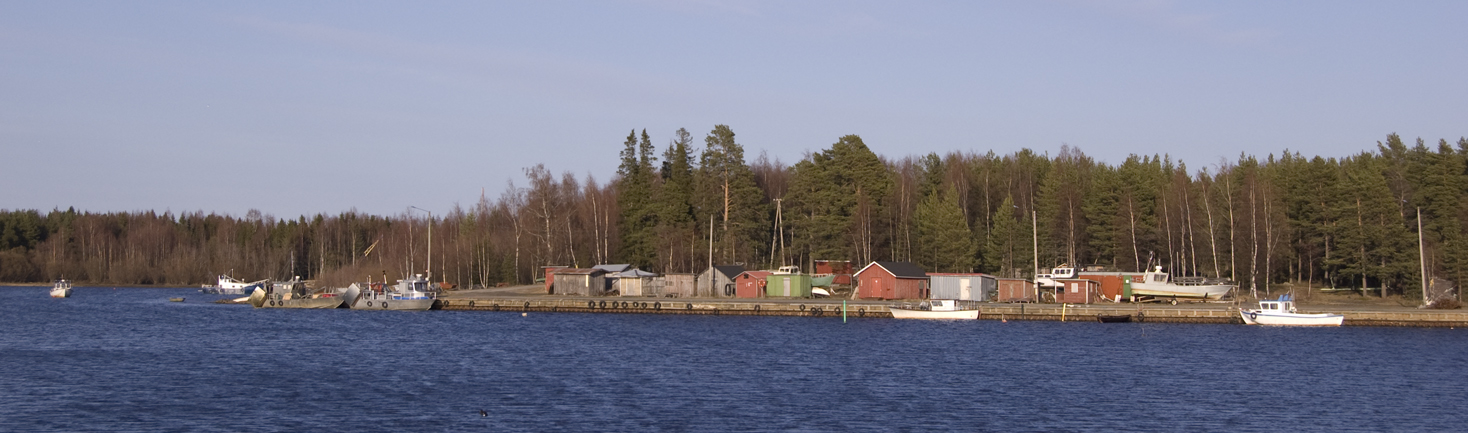
Kurtinhauta fishing harbour

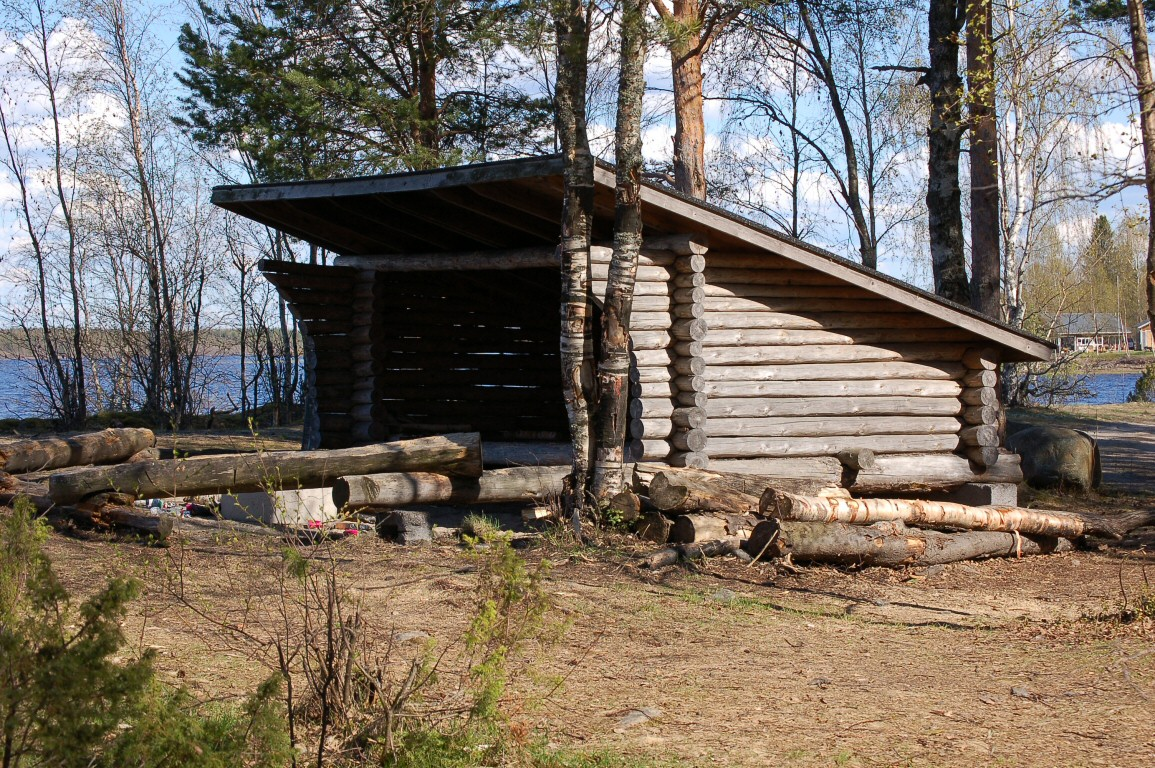
Finnish 'laavu'
