= Jokikylä =

City district in Oulu, Finland

Coordinates: 65°11′25″N 025°28′06″E

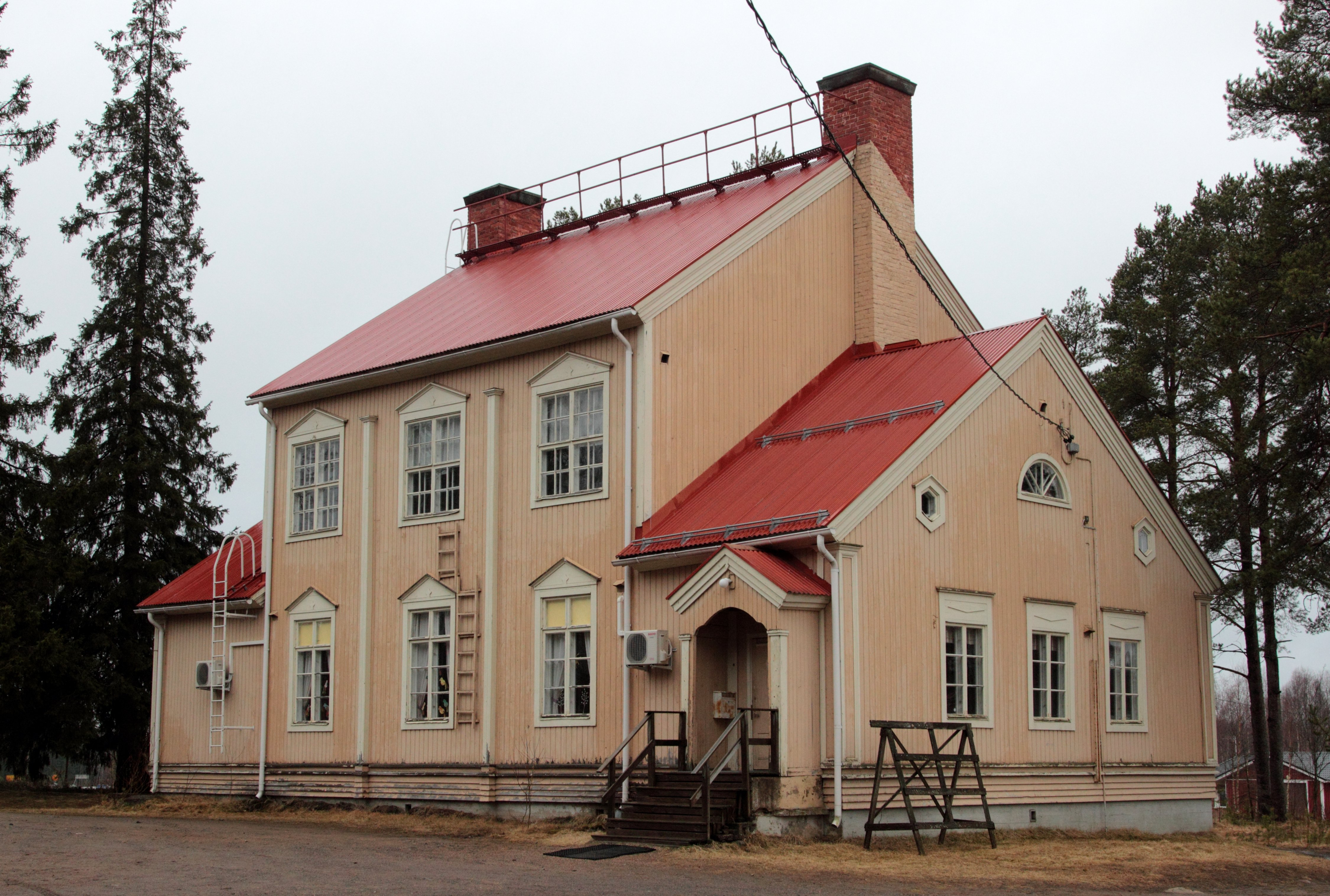
The former Jokela School

Jokikylä is a district and a small village of the city of Haukipudas, Oulu, Finland, with approximately 100 residents.

Laestadianism, a conservative Lutheran movement, is strongly represented in Jokikylä. The nearest shops are 8 kilometres (5 mi) away. There is a little school with classes 0–6 in Jokikylä.
