= Yli-Ii =

- Former municipality
- Yli-Iin kunta Överijo kommun
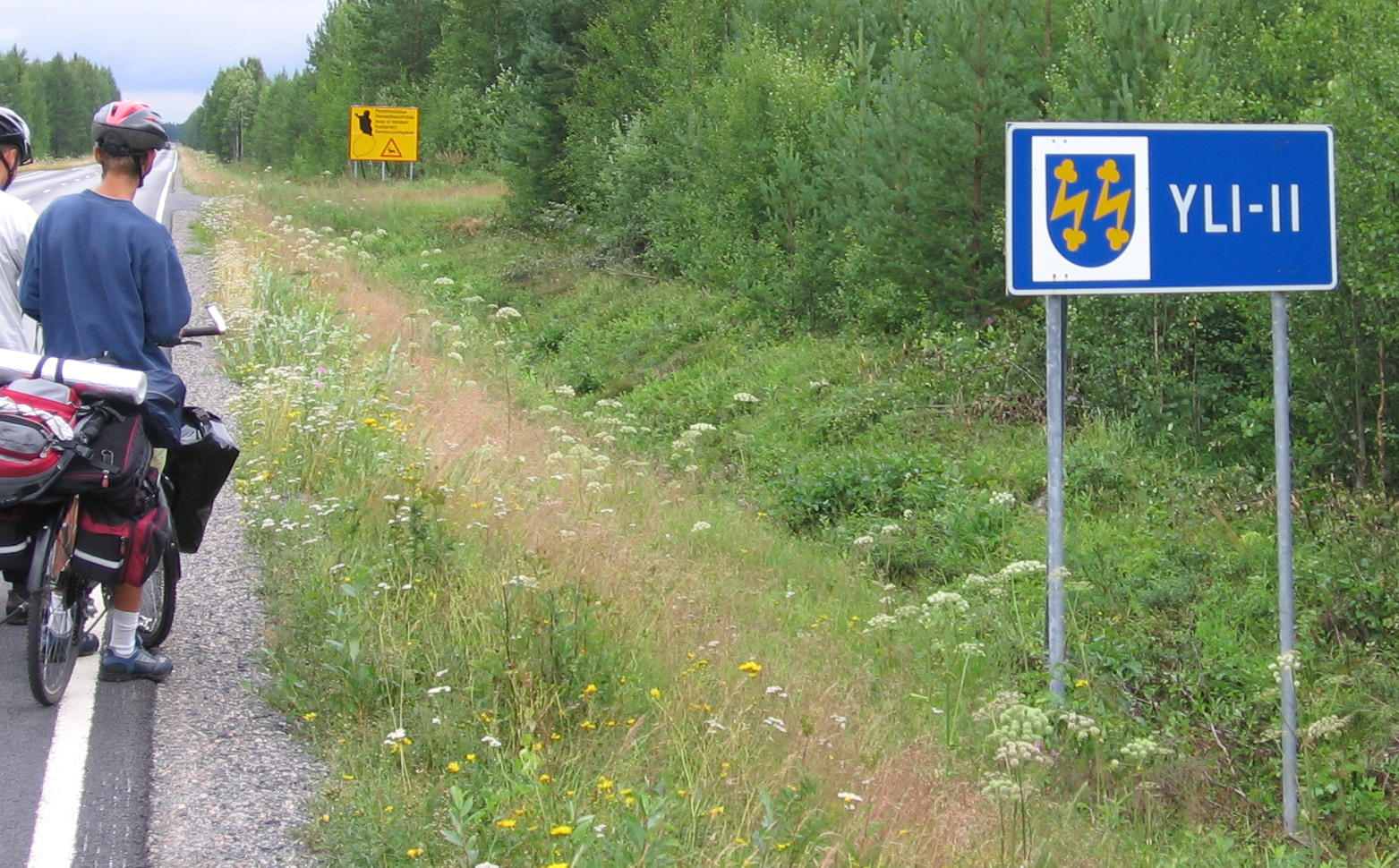

- Coat of arms

- Location of Yli-Ii in Finland
- Coordinates: 65°22′20″N 025°50′25″E
- Country: Finland
- Region: North Ostrobothnia
- Sub-region: Oulunkaari
- Charter: 1924

Government
  - Municipal manager: Pekka Tolonen

Area
  - Total: 793.27 km^{2} (306.28 sq mi)
  - Land: 769.15 km^{2} (296.97 sq mi)
  - Water: 24.12 km^{2} (9.31 sq mi)

Population (31 December 2012)
  - Total: 2,179
- Time zone: UTC+2 (EET)
  - Summer (DST): UTC+3 (EEST)
- Website: www.yli-ii.fi

Yli-Ii (Swedish: Överijo) was a municipality of Finland. It was located in the province of Oulu and was part of the North Ostrobothnia region. Alongside Haukipudas, Kiiminki and Oulunsalo municipalities it was merged with the city of Oulu on 1 January 2013. The municipality had a population of 2,179 (31 December 2012) and covered an area of 793.27 square kilometres (306.28 sq mi) of which 24.12 km^{2} (9.31 sq mi) is water. The population density was 2.8330/km^{2} (7.3374/sq mi).

The municipality was unilingually Finnish.

Yli-Ii is probably best known from a pre-historical museum called Kierikkikeskus.
