= Oulunsalo =

- Former municipality
- Oulunsalon kunta Oulunsalo kommun
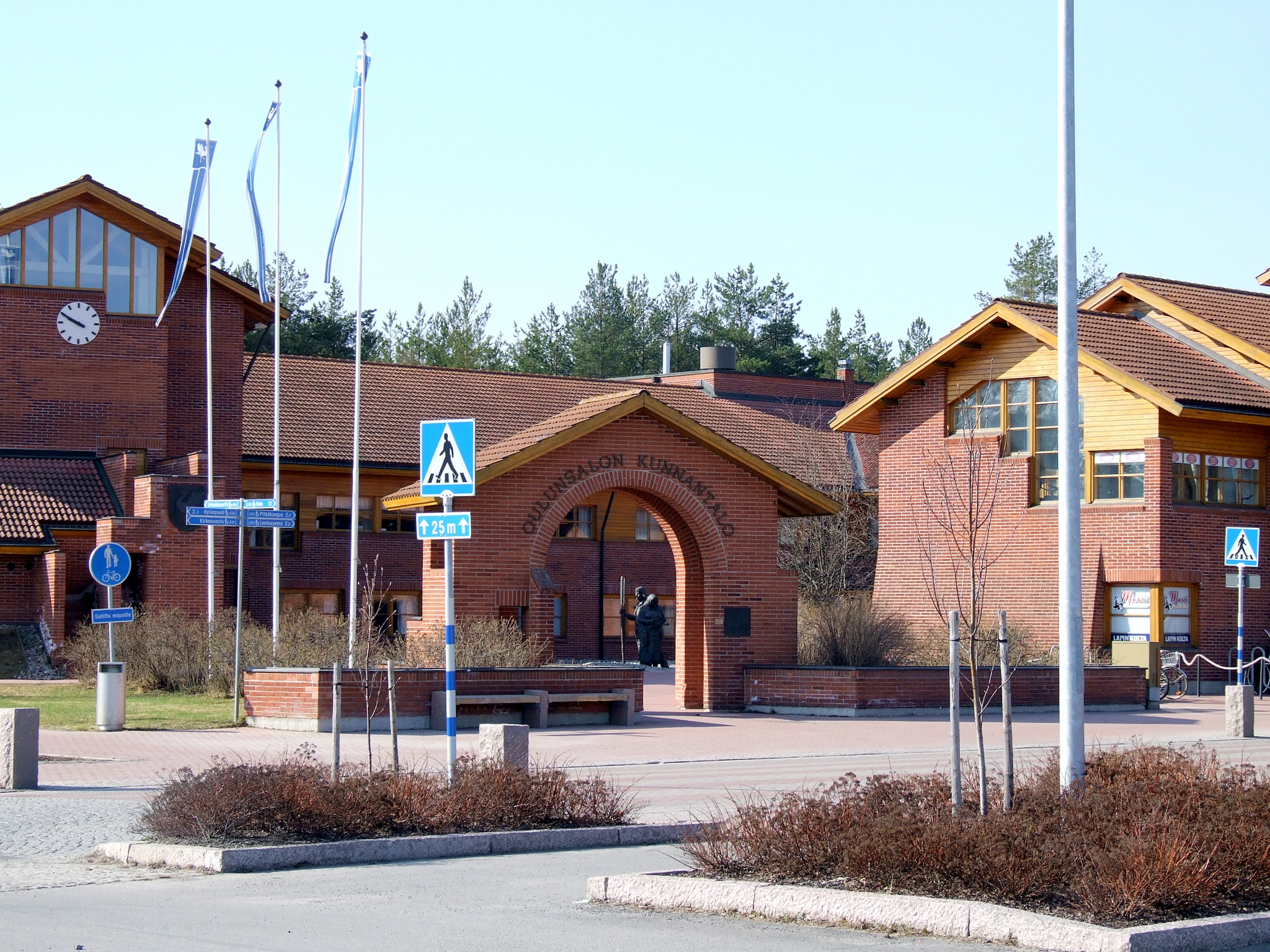
- The town hall of Oulunsalo

- Coat of arms

- Coordinates: 64°56′N 025°25′E
- Country: Finland
- Region: North Ostrobothnia
- Sub-region: Oulu sub-region
- Charter: 1882
- Merged: 2013

Government
  - Municipal manager: Sirkka Ylitervo

Area
  - Total: 211.22 km^{2} (81.55 sq mi)
  - Land: 83.36 km^{2} (32.19 sq mi)
  - Water: 127.86 km^{2} (49.37 sq mi)

Population (2012-12-31)
  - Total: 9,746
  - Density: 116.9/km^{2} (302.8/sq mi)
- Time zone: UTC+2 (EET)
  - Summer (DST): UTC+3 (EEST)
- Website: www.oulunsalo.fi

Oulunsalo (former Swedish: Uleåsalo, now considered outdated by the Institute for the Languages of Finland) is a former municipality in the region of North Ostrobothnia, in Finland. It was founded in 1882 and merged into the city of Oulu on 1 January 2013, along with Haukipudas, Kiiminki and Yli-Ii. The municipality had a population of 9,746 (31 December 2012) and covered an area of 211.22 square kilometres (81.55 sq mi), of which 127.86 km^{2} (49.37 sq mi) is water. Its population density was 116.915/km^{2} (302.81/sq mi).

Oulu Airport is located in Oulunsalo.

Oulunsalo was one of the fastest-growing areas in Finland, among the other municipalities around Oulu.

The locality is unilingually Finnish.

== Politics ==
Results of the 2011 Finnish parliamentary election in Oulunsalo:

- Centre Party 33.1%
- True Finns 21.4%
- National Coalition Party 15.9%
- Left Alliance 10.9%
- Social Democratic Party 8.9%
- Green League 6.4%
- Christian Democrats 2.3%
- Pirate Party 0.3%
- Swedish People's Party 0.3%

== Friendship cities ==
- Tanno, Japan (since 1992)
- Matera, Italy, (since 2009)

== Notable people ==
- Saara Aalto
- Mikael Granlund
- Markus Granlund
- Janne Kuokkanen

== See also ==
- Finnish regional road 816
- Hailuoto Island
- Kempele
