= Kiiminki =

- Former municipality
- Kiimingin kunta Kiminge kommun
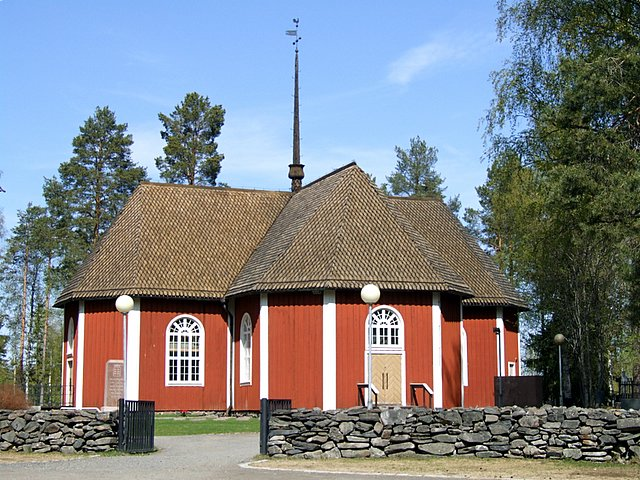
- Kiiminki Church, built in 1760

- Coat of arms

- Location of Kiiminki in Finland
- Coordinates: 65°08′N 025°46.5′E
- Country: Finland
- Region: North Ostrobothnia
- Sub-region: Oulu sub-region
- Charter: 1867

Government
  - Municipal manager: Jukka Weisell

Area
  - Total: 339.00 km^{2} (130.89 sq mi)
  - Land: 12.18 km^{2} (4.70 sq mi)
  - Water: 326.82 km^{2} (126.19 sq mi)

Population (31 December 2012)
  - Total: 13,320
  - Density: 1,094/km^{2} (2,832/sq mi)
- Time zone: UTC+2 (EET)
  - Summer (DST): UTC+3 (EEST)
- Website: www.kiiminki.fi

Kiiminki (Finnish: [ˈkiːmiŋki]; Swedish: Kiminge) was a municipality of Finland. Along with Haukipudas, Oulunsalo and Yli-Ii municipalities it was merged with the city of Oulu on 1 January 2013. Kiiminki municipality was part of the Oulu province in the North Ostrobothnia region. The municipality had a population of 13,320 (31 December 2012) and covered an area of 339.00 square kilometres (130.89 sq mi) of which 326.82 km^{2} (126.19 sq mi) is water. The population density is 1,093.6/km^{2} (2,832.4/sq mi). The municipality was unilingually Finnish.

The drawknives on the coat of arms of Kiiminki reflect the traditional craftsmanship of the locality, especially the making of wooden containers and sledges. The coat of arms was designed by Oskari Jauhiainen and Olof Eriksson, and was approved by the Kiiminki municipal council at its meeting on 17 June 1968. The Ministry of the Interior confirmed the coat of arms for use on 1 October of the same year.

== Buildings and structures ==
There is a 326-metre tall guyed mast for FM- and TV broadcasting.
