= Kiiminkijoki =

River of Finland

Coordinates: 65.2019°N 25.2842°E

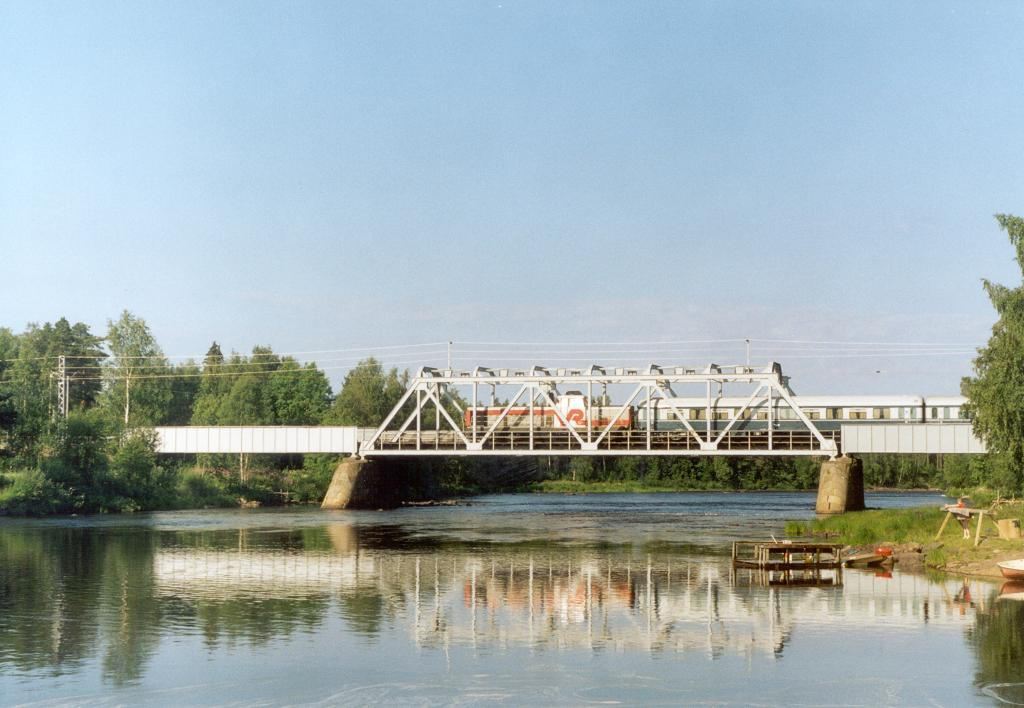

Kiiminkijoki (Swedish: Kiminge älv) is a river of Finland in the region of Northern Ostrobothnia. It flows for 170 kilometres (110 mi) into the Gulf of Bothnia.

Among the most impressive rapids on the river are Kalliuskoski in Puolanka, Kurimonkoski in Utajärvi, and Koitelinkoski in Kiiminki, Oulu.

== See also ==
- List of rivers in Finland
