= Keskiniemi Light =

Keskiniemi Range Front Light
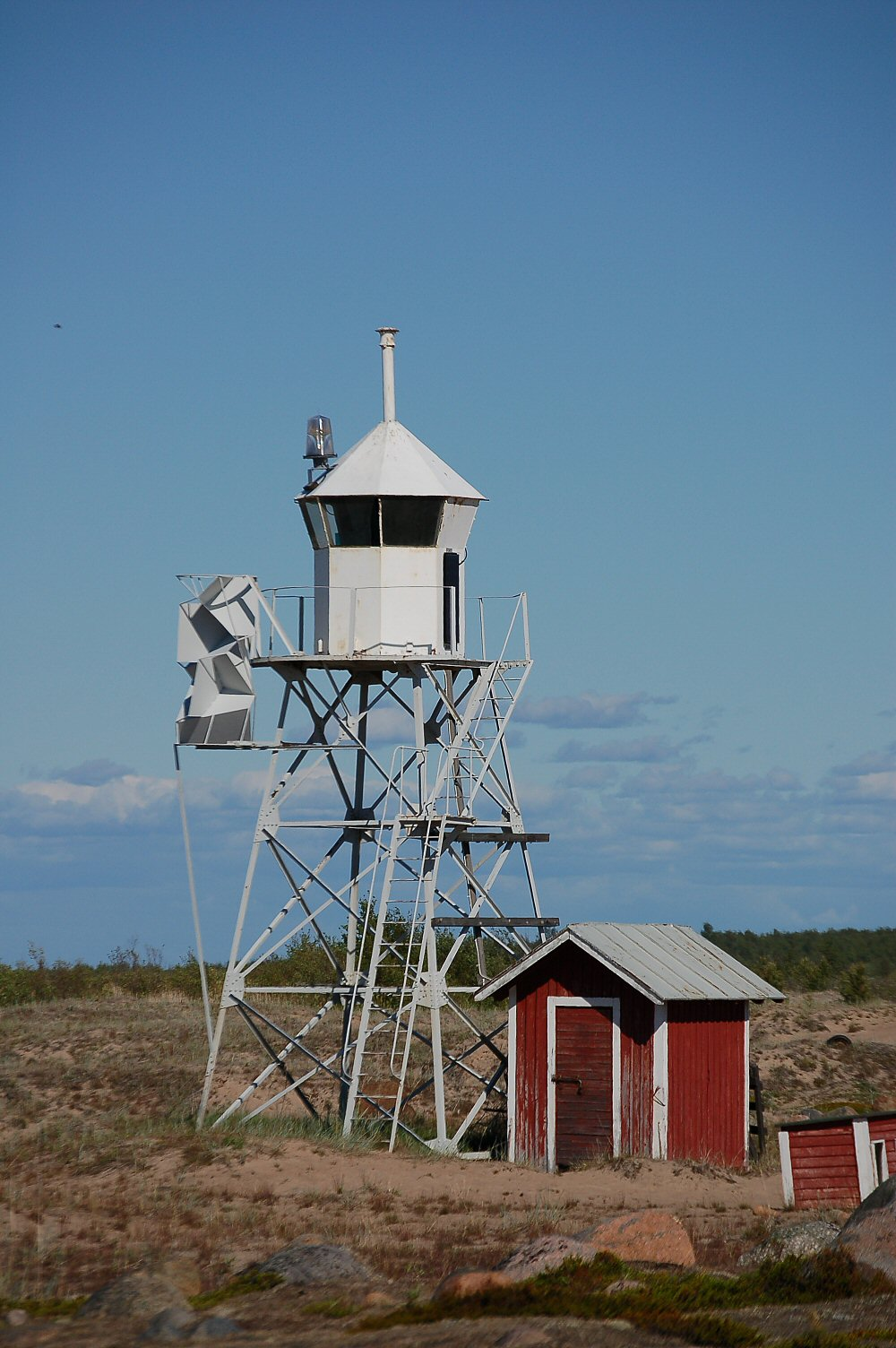
- Keskiniemi light is a modern sector light alongside the Keskiniemi daybeacon.
- Location: Hailuoto island, Gulf of Bothnia; Finland
- Coordinates: 65°04′53.5″N 24°38′55.6″E

Tower
- Constructed: 1908
- Construction: steel tower
- Height: 9 metres (30 ft)
- Shape: square skeletal tower with octagonal lantern and gallery
- Markings: white tower and lantern

Light
- First lit: 1908
- Focal height: 8.8 metres (29 ft)
- Range: 6.5 nautical miles (12.0 km; 7.5 mi)
- Characteristic: Fl W 6s

Keskiniemi Light is a sector light tower located in the northwestern promontory of Hailuoto island in the Gulf of Bothnia in Finland. It was built in 1908 and is located next to the Keskiniemi beacon tower built in 1858.

Keskiniemi Light is a square steel skeletal tower with white octagonal lantern and gallery. The focal plane of the light is 8.8 metres (29 ft) and it has a range of 6.5 nautical miles. The beacon displays a white flash every 6 seconds, visible in all directions. The tower also has a radar reflector on the northwest side.

The light is one of six lights built in 1908 to guide vessels along the fairway leading to the Port of Oulu. Originally it had an oil-burning lantern, which was replaced with a gas-burning lantern manufactured by AGA in 1941. Currently the power source is solar electricity. Originally the light was a sector light, but the coloured sectors have been removed due to the changes in shipping lanes over the years.

There is an old storage shed for gas bottles next to the tower. This shed is currently unused.

Keskiniemi Light is the only surviving light of those built in 1908 for the fairway leading into Oulu harbour, and with the exception of Tauvo lighthouse it is also the only steel skeletal tower still in active service as a light along the Finnish coast of the Bothnian Bay.

== Sources ==
- Finnish List of Lights 2007 (in Finnish and Swedish). Merenkulkulaitos (Finnish Maritime Administration). p. 30. ISBN 978-951-49-0873-6.
- Rowlett, Russ. "Lighthouses of Northern Finland". The Lighthouse Directory. University of North Carolina at Chapel Hill.
