= Laitakari beacon tower =

Coordinates: 65°03′09″N 025°09′28″E

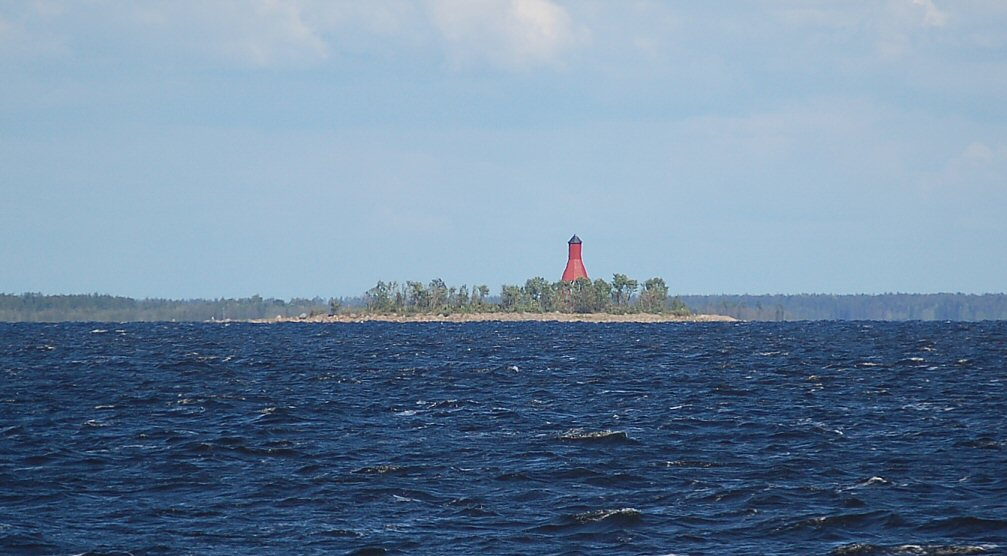
A distant view to Laitakari and the beacon tower

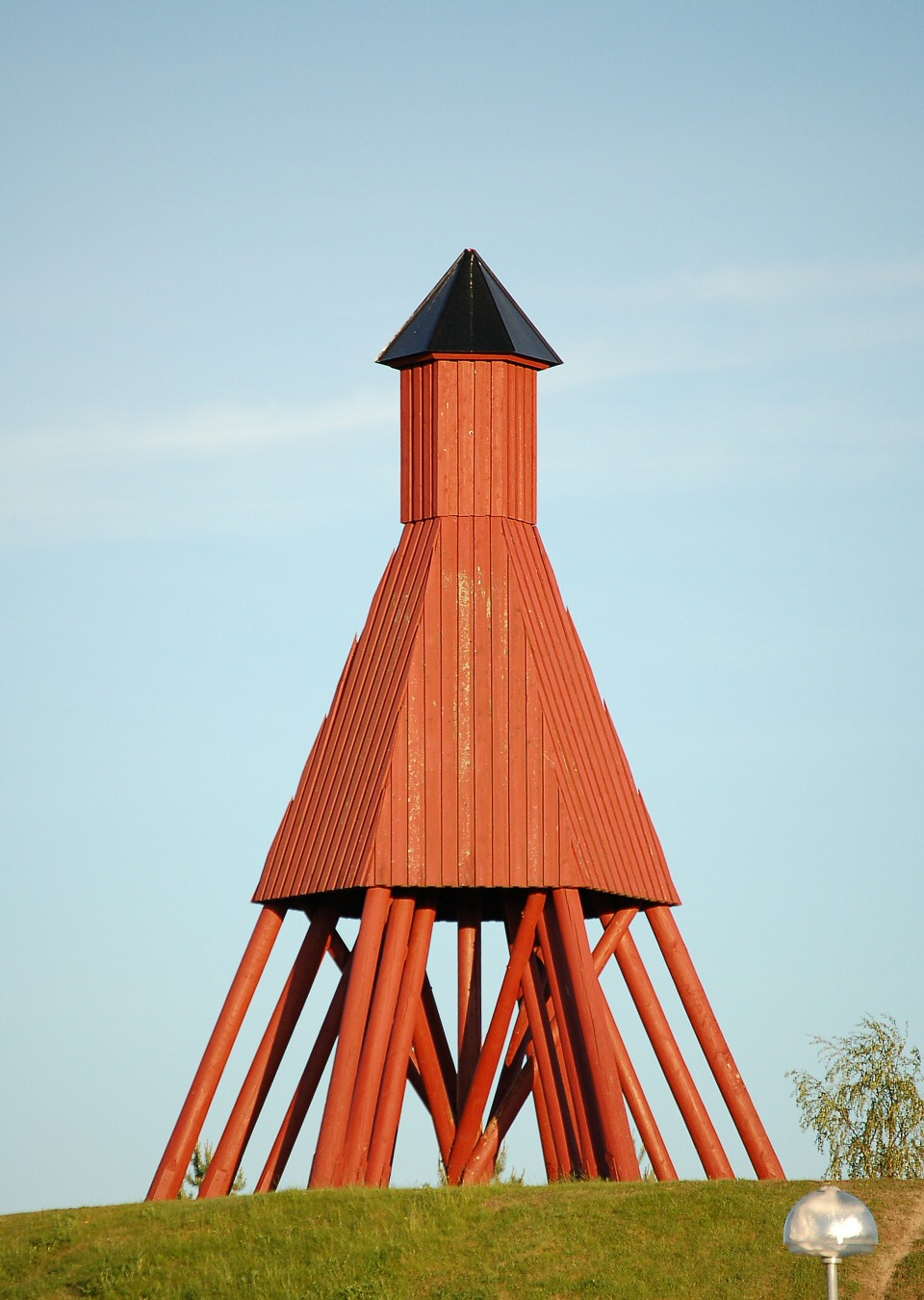
A small-scale replica of Laitakari beacon tower in Pitkäkangas, Oulunsalo

Laitakari beacon tower is a daymark (navigational aid) located on the island of Laitakari in the Gulf of Bothnia in Finland. The island is located east-northeast of Hailuoto and is within the municipal boundaries of the City of Oulu. There has been a navigational aid on the island since the 1750s, and a beacon tower has been marked on a chart dated in 1785.

The current Laitakari beacon tower was built in 1851. The top of the tower is built of wooden boards and painted red. The top structure is resting on top of supporting wooden beams wedged into the gravel. The structure survived the Crimean War, and is still being used as a navigational aid. When aligned with the bell tower of Oulu Cathedral, it guides small vessels to the fairway leading past the northern coastline of Hailuoto island.

The tower is 17.4 metres (57 ft) high from sea level and 15.6 metres (51 ft) from the ground.

== Sources ==
- Laurell, Seppo (1999). "Laitakari". Suomen majakat – Finnish Lighthouses. Merenkulkulaitos (Finnish Maritime Administration). p. 77. ISBN 952-5180-21-2.
