= Great tower =

Great tower may refer to:

- The keep of a mediaeval castle
- Great Tower Activity Centre, a scouting activity centre in Windermere, Cumbria, UK
- Great Tower Neuwerk, Neuwerk Island, Germany
