= Keskiniemi beacon tower =

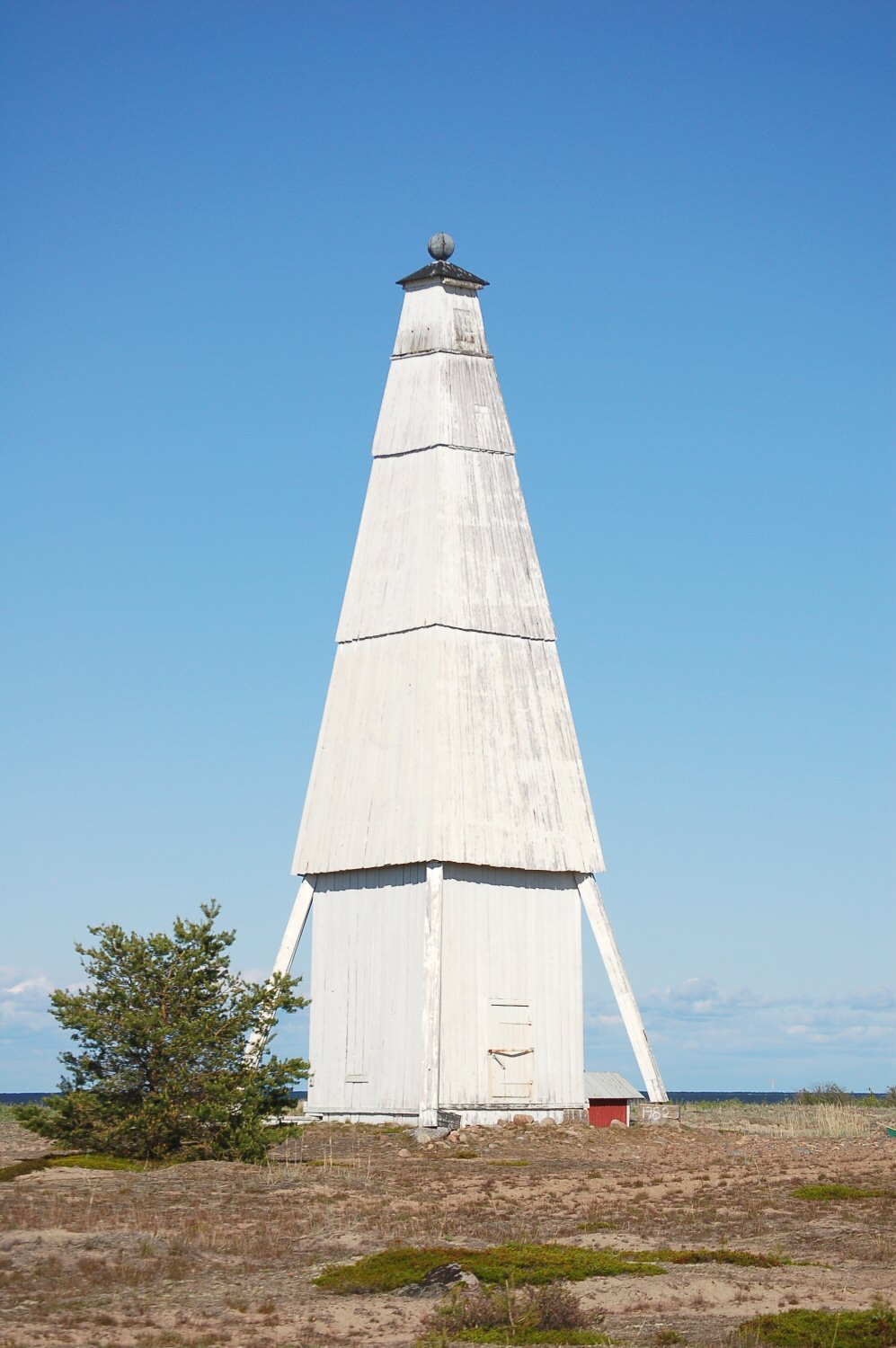
Keskiniemi daybeacon in 2007. 65°4.842′N 24°39.257′E

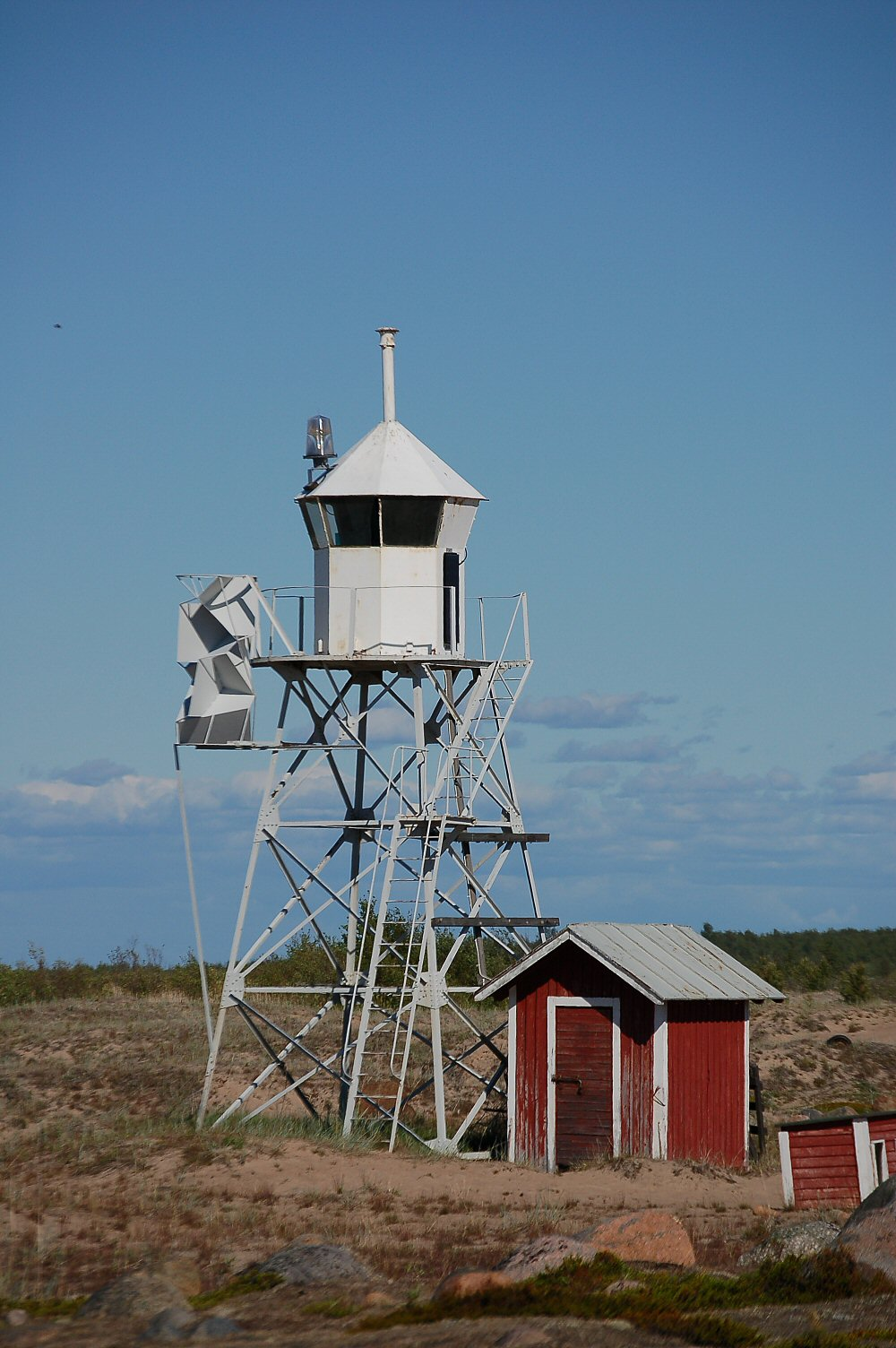
Modern sector light alongside the beacon tower.

The Keskiniemi beacon tower (Keskiniemen tunnusmajakka in Finnish), often referred to as the Karvo beacon tower, is a historic daymark located on a promontory of Keskiniemi in the northwestern part of Hailuoto island in the Gulf of Bothnia in Finland. The tower was built in 1858 to alert the vessels about sandbars reaching northwest from the site. It is the oldest surviving navigational aid on Hailuoto island. The tower has structural similarities with the Härkmeri beacon tower built in 1857.

The wooden tower has a six-metre (20 ft) high square base with a square pyramidical top. The first floor houses a 70 cm (2 1/3 feet) thick layer of stones serving as a counterweight to prevent the structure from tipping in wind. The structure also has wooden beams in all four corners for increased support against winds. The tower has a wooden top ornament.

The structure measures 18,9 meters (62 ft) high from the ground, with the top being 20,9 meters (87 ft) above sea level. All of its faces are white.

The current beacon tower is the second navigational aid located on the Keskiniemi promontory. In a navigational map dated on 1785 by Henrik Wacklin a beacon tower is shown at the same location.

The tower has never been lit. Keskiniemi sector light was erected alongside the tower in 1908.
