= Daymark =

Daytime aid to navigation

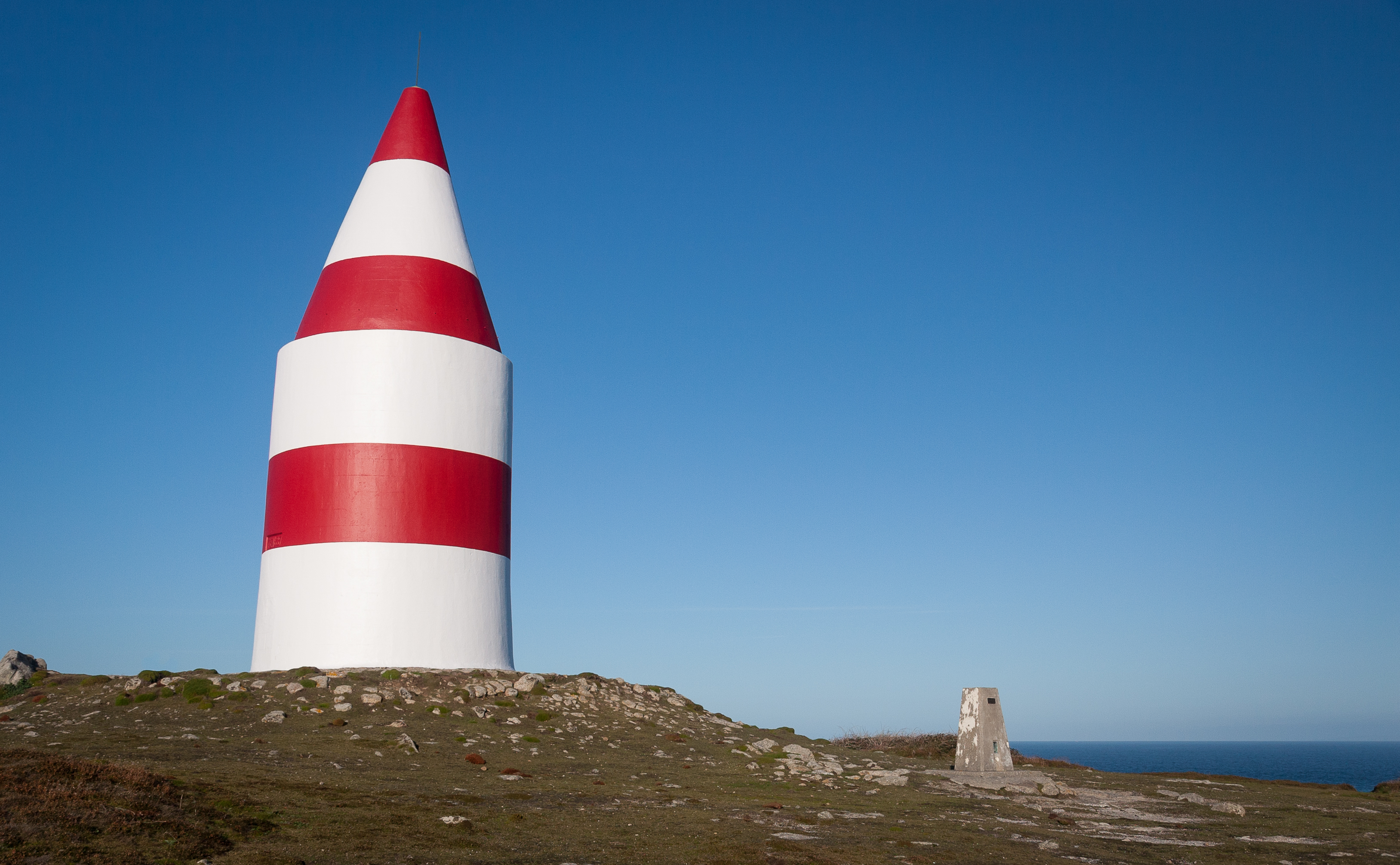
Daymark on St Martin's, Isles of Scilly

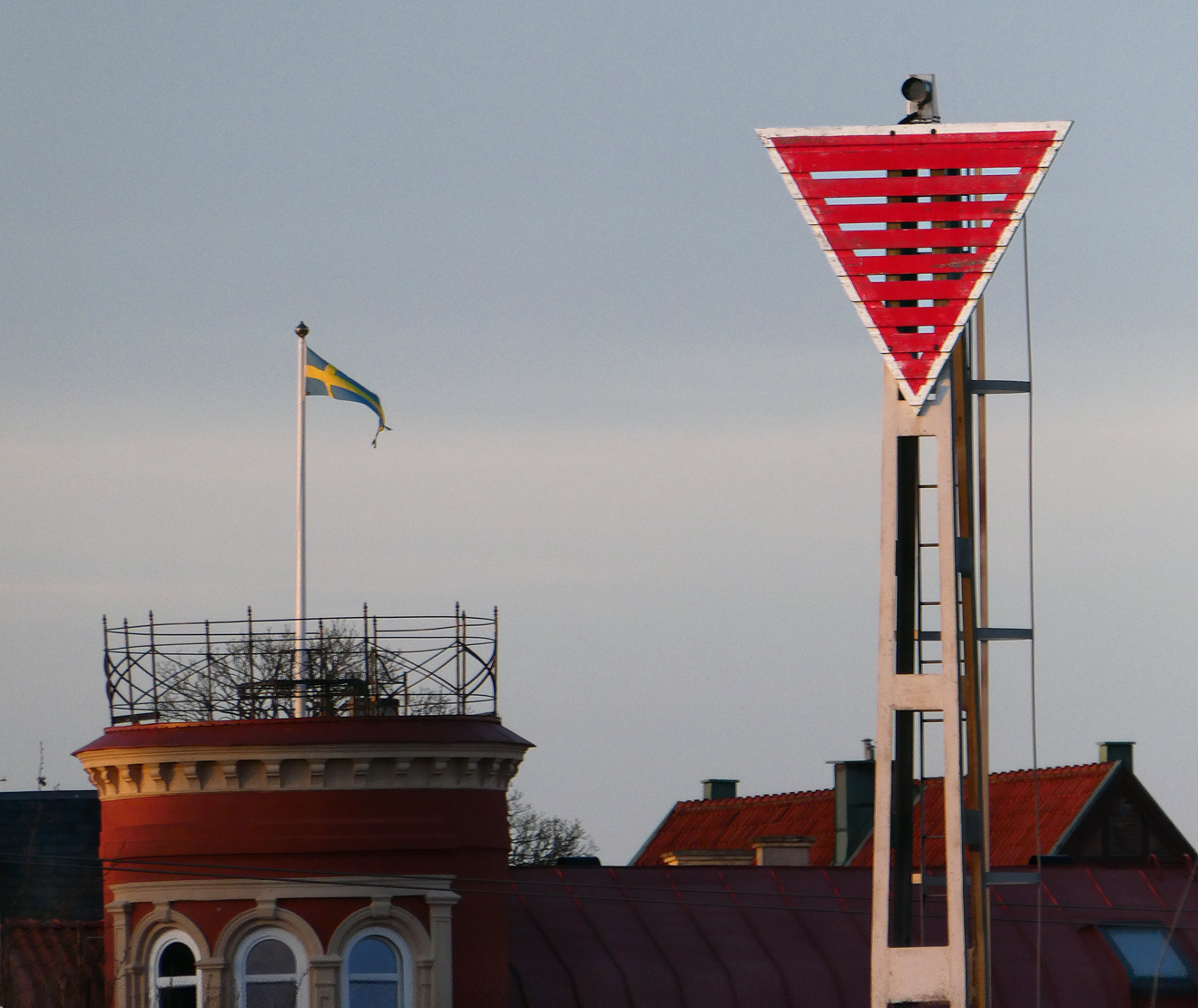
Triangular daymark in the marina of Ystad, 2021

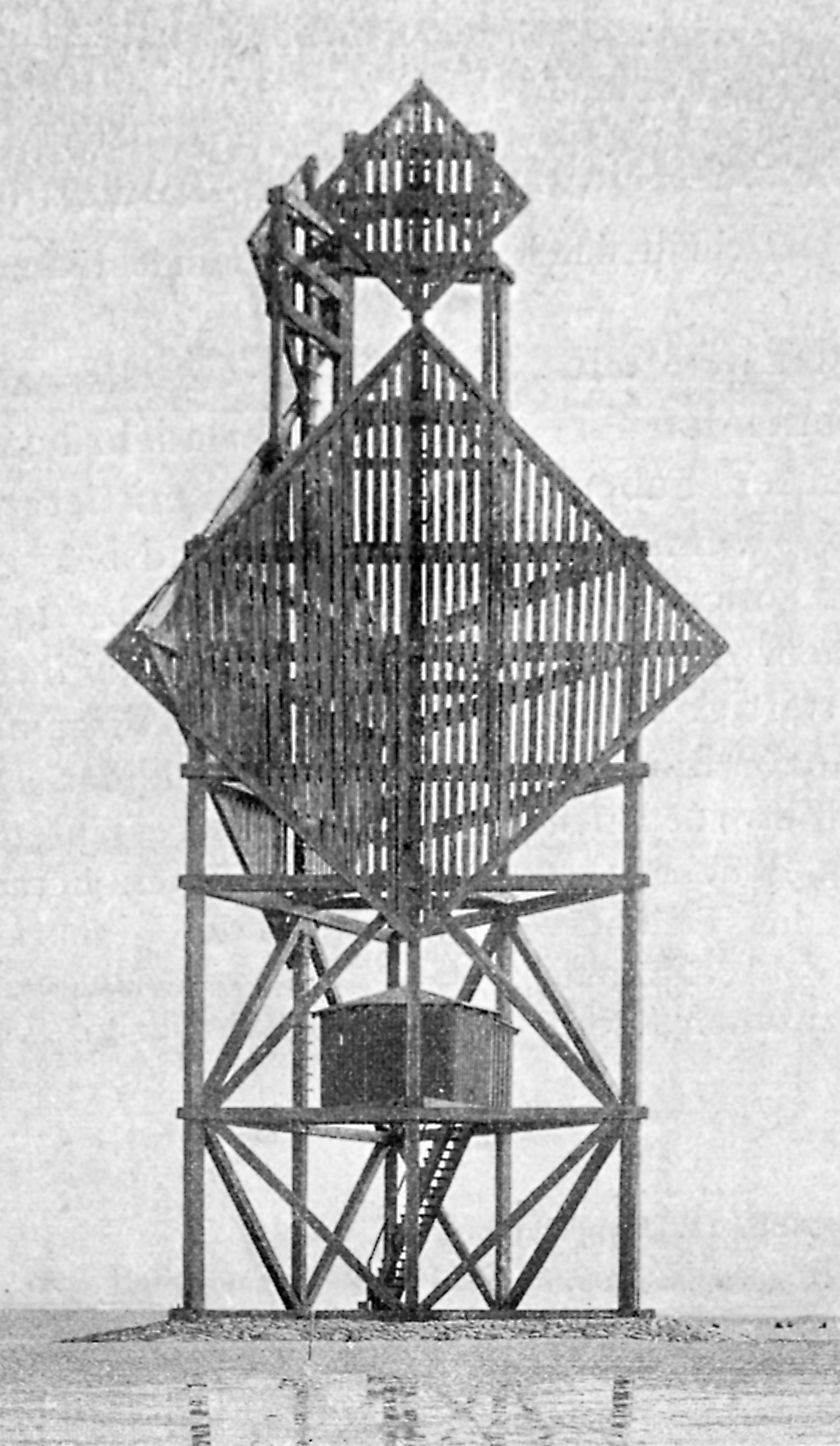
Scharhörn daymark in 1898

A daymark is a navigational aid for sailors and pilots, distinctively marked to maximize its visibility in daylight.

The word is also used in a more specific, technical sense to refer to a signboard or daytime identifier that is attached to a day beacon or other aid to navigation. In that sense, a daymark conveys to the mariner during daylight hours the same significance as the aid's light or reflector does at night. Standard signboard shapes are square, triangular, and rectangular, and standard colours are red, green, orange, yellow, and black.

== Notable daymarks ==
- Trinity House Obelisk, UK
- Kingswear Daymark, UK
- Tasku beacon tower, Finland
- Keskiniemi beacon tower, Finland
- Hiidenniemi beacon tower, Finland
- Laitakari beacon tower, Finland
- Mässkär beacon tower, Finland
- Herring Tower, Langness, Isle of Man
- Le Hocq, Jersey
- La Tour Cârrée, Jersey
- Scharhörnbake, Germany

== Symbols used on US charts ==
Chart symbols used by the US National Oceanic and Atmospheric Administration Department, 2013.

Paper chart	Simplified	Simplified symbol name
		Square or rectangular daymark
		Triangular daymark, point up
		Triangular daymark, point down
		Retro reflector

== See also ==
- Landmark
- Lighthouse
- Sea mark
