= Scharhörnbake =

Historic daymark in Germany

Coordinates: 53°57′24″N 8°24′36″E

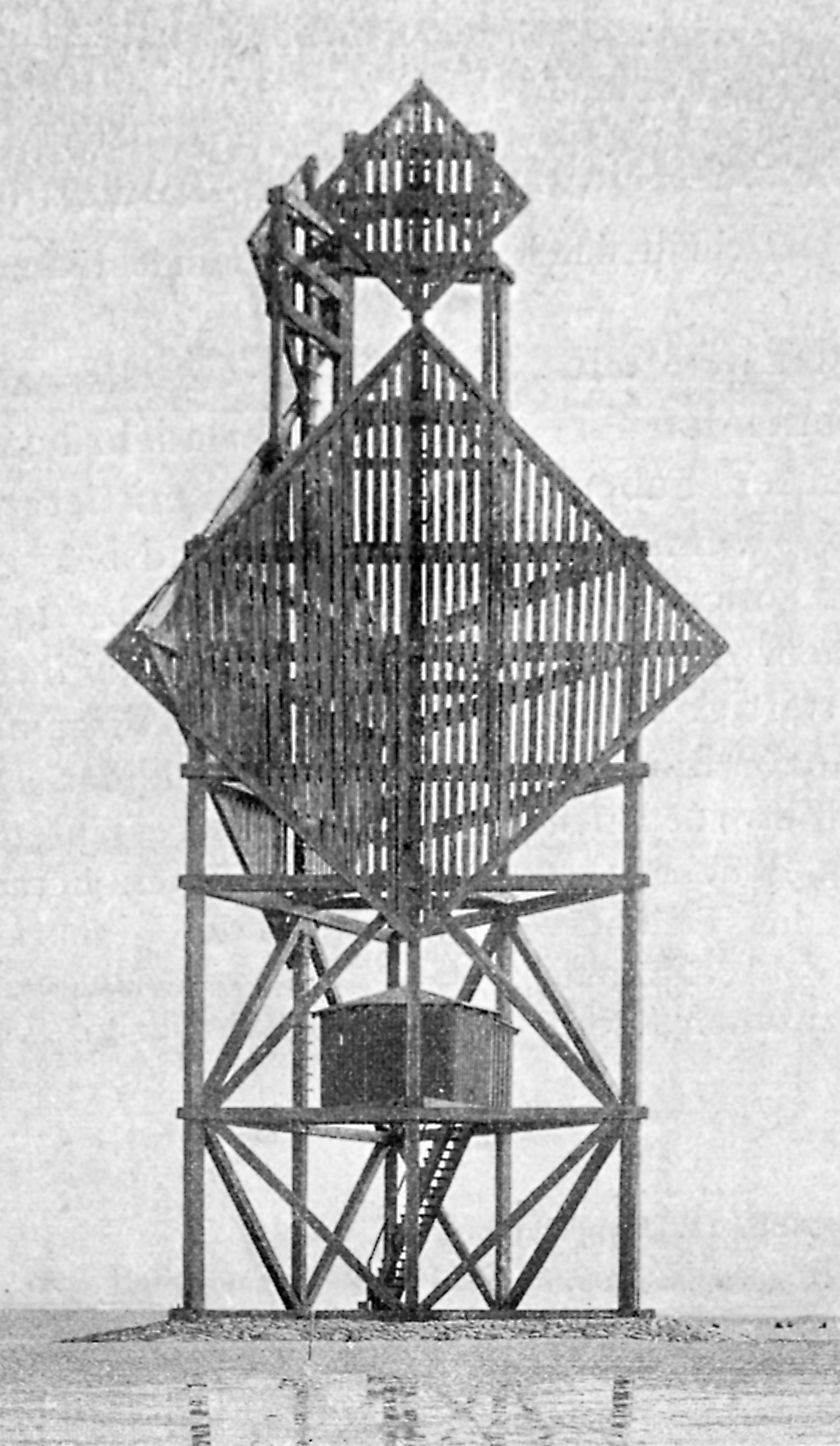
Scharhörnbake 1898

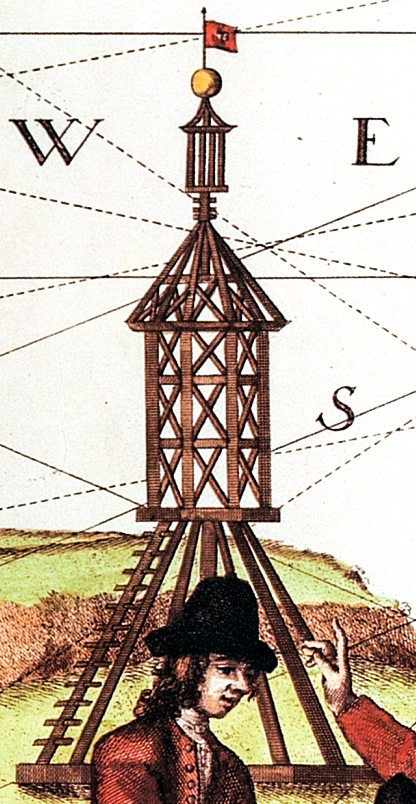
Scharhörnbake as an illustration on a 1721 map

The Scharhörnbake (German pronunciation: [ˈʃaʁhœʁnˌbaːkə]) was the most important daymark on the German North Sea coast for several centuries. First erected in 1661 by the City of Hamburg on the sandbank Scharhörn and south side of the Elbe estuary, it was rebuilt over centuries and taken down in 1979 after 318 years. Equipped with a room, it also functioned as a refuge beacon for shipwreck survivors from 1840 to 1965. The only remaining element today is the boulder stone foundation near Nigehörn.

With a height of 29.10 meters (95'6"), it was the highest daymark from 1898 until 23 December 1914 on the North Sea coast.

Often destroyed by storms, it was also taken down in wartime to make navigation harder for enemy ships.

== Function ==
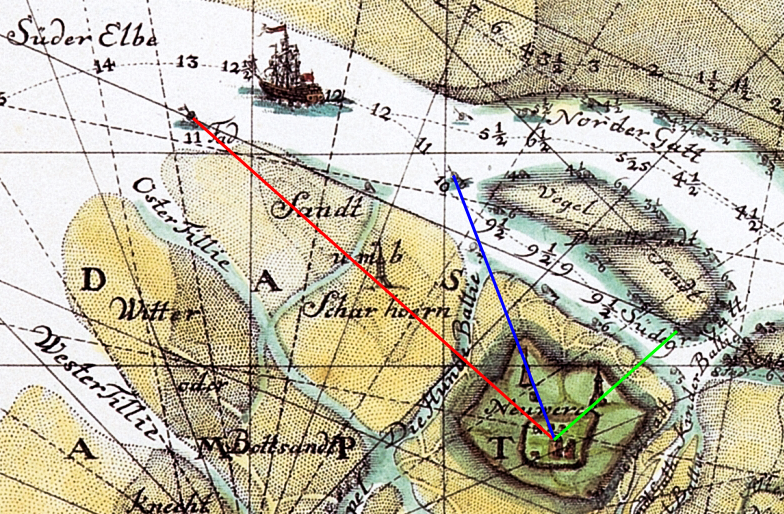
Bearing (red) from the Rothe Ton via the Scharhörnbake to the Great Tower Neuwerk (1721)

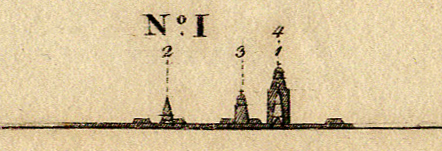
View from the Rothe Ton with the Scharhörnbake (1) in front of the Great Tower Neuwerk (4) (1831)

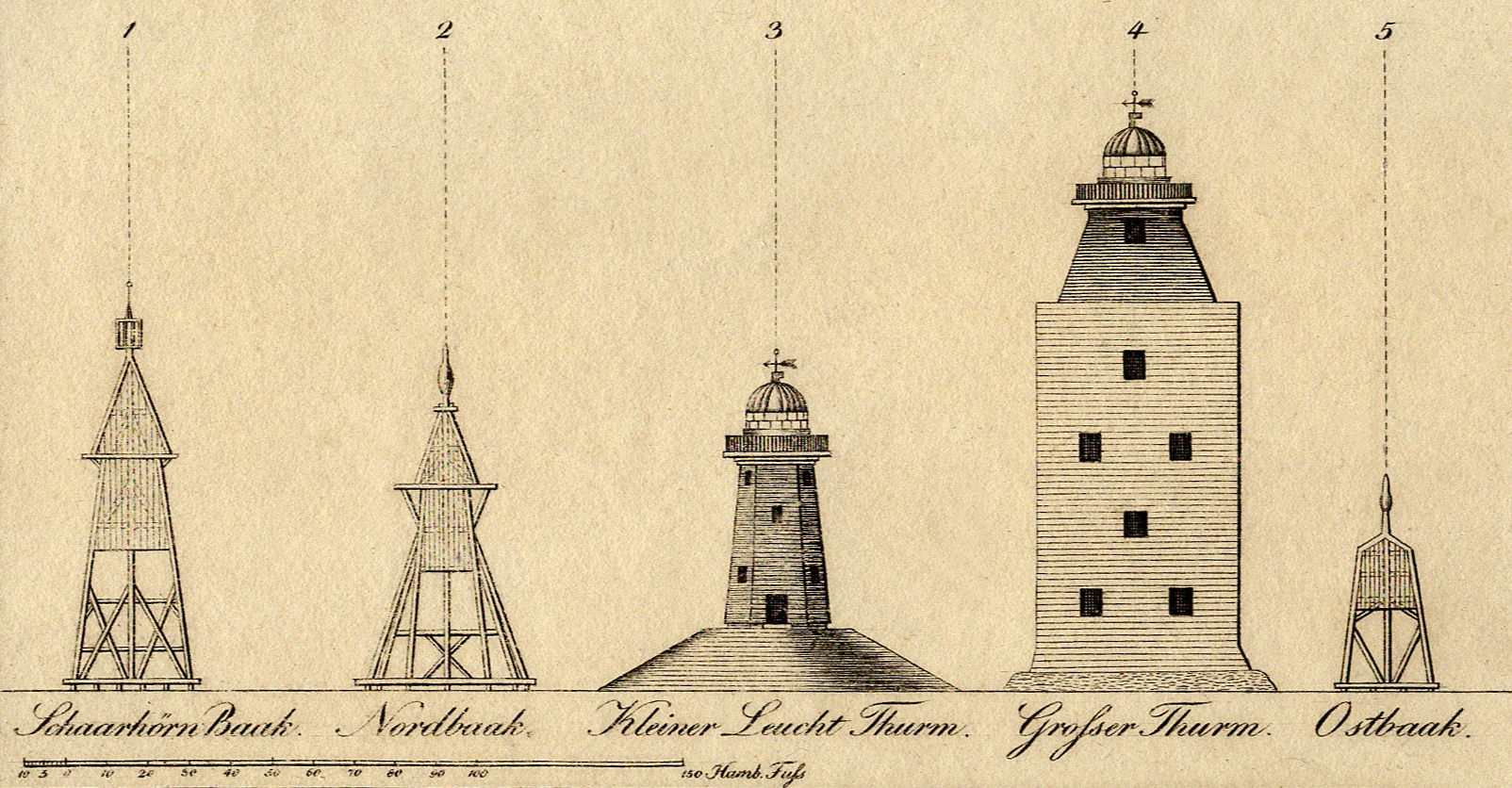
The Scharhörn Baak (1) as part of the various navigational aids around and on Neuwerk (1831)

The main function of the daymark was to aid navigation for ships around the feared Scharhörn Reef into the Elbe coming from the North Sea. Many ships wrecked at this dangerous passage. As Hamburg depended most on this, it maintained sea marks around the reefs and the routes via the Südergatt und Nordergatt starting 1440. Coming from the sea the first and most important on starboard was the Rothe Ton. The bearing to the Great Tower Neuwerk via the Scharhörnbake was essential to spot is beacon (see red line).

Further bearings using the Great Tower Neuwerk were:

- the Nordbake to obscure the Blüse Neuwerk and later the (small) Lighthouse Neuwerk to spot the Scharton (before the Vogelsand, blue line)
- the Werkbalger Bake to spot the Butterton (after the Vogelsand, green Linie).

Considering the cost and effort to build and maintain the Scharhörnbake as the highest daymark and the Great Tower Neuwerk as the oldest "sea tower" underlines the importance of the Elbe estuary to the city and state of Hamburg.

The room for refugees was added around 1840. The emergency provisions were routinely refreshed. As the sandbank Scharhörn grew into an island by plantations, this function was made obsolete by the first shacks starting 1929.

== Appearance ==
Form and position varied with each reconstruction. At first, it was a wooden structure combining a pyramid and a square. It was not until the mid 19th century that it appeared in its striking form consisting of two diamonds above each other.

== See also ==
- List of lighthouses and lightvessels in Germany
