= Hiidenniemi beacon tower =

Tower on the island of Hailuoto, Finland

Hiidenniemi beacon tower (Finnish: Hiidenniemen pooki) was a historic daymark tower on the northern coast of Hailuoto island in Gulf of Bothnia in Finland. The structure was located at the northernmost point of the island, a minor promontory named Hiidenniemi.

The structure was built in 1859 from the plans drawn by Ernst Lohrmann. It was a wooden hexagonal (six-sided) tower. The tower had a topmarker, which was either a weather vane or a simple flag. The structure was later destroyed by fire and never rebuilt.

== Sources ==
- Nyman, Harri. "Väylien varsilta: Pohjanmaan rannikon puupookit" (in Finnish). Archived from the original on 2005-01-11.
