= Tasku beacon tower =

Coordinates: 64°42′39″N 24°23′12″E

Tasku beacon tower (Taskun pooki in Finnish) is a daymark tower located on the island of Tasku (Pocket in English) in the Raahe archipelago in the Gulf of Bothnia in Finland. The structure was built in 1853 from the plans drawn by Albin Stjerncreutz. In 1983 the Finnish Maritime Administration handed it over to the City of Raahe. Currently the city is responsible for the upkeep of this historical aid to navigation. The Tasku beacon tower is one of three historical beacon towers in the Raahe archipelago; however, only two beacon towers remain: the second one is the Iso-Kraaseli beacon tower.

The tower is made of wood and supported by a wooden central column measuring 1.5 meters (5 feet) around. The tower consists of a square bottom section, followed by a pyramidal top section. The top marker is a wooden cross, rising 19.2 meters (63 feet) above sea level. The tower is painted yellow. The beacon tower has historical cultural heritage and is a part of Finnish maritime building heritage.

The city of Raahe reconditioned and repainted the beacon in 2002–2003. The restoration was honored by the Finnish Lighthouse Society in 2004.

The beacon tower was not the first daymark on Tasku Island. There has been a daymark built in the 1650s of unknown proportions; also, its characteristics are unknown.

== Sources ==
- Finnish Lighthouse Society: Daybeacons of Raahe, February 2005 (in Finnish)
- City of Raahe: Ookko kuullu? Taskun pooki (in Finnish)
