= La Tour Cârrée =

Coordinates: 49.2170°N 2.2264°W

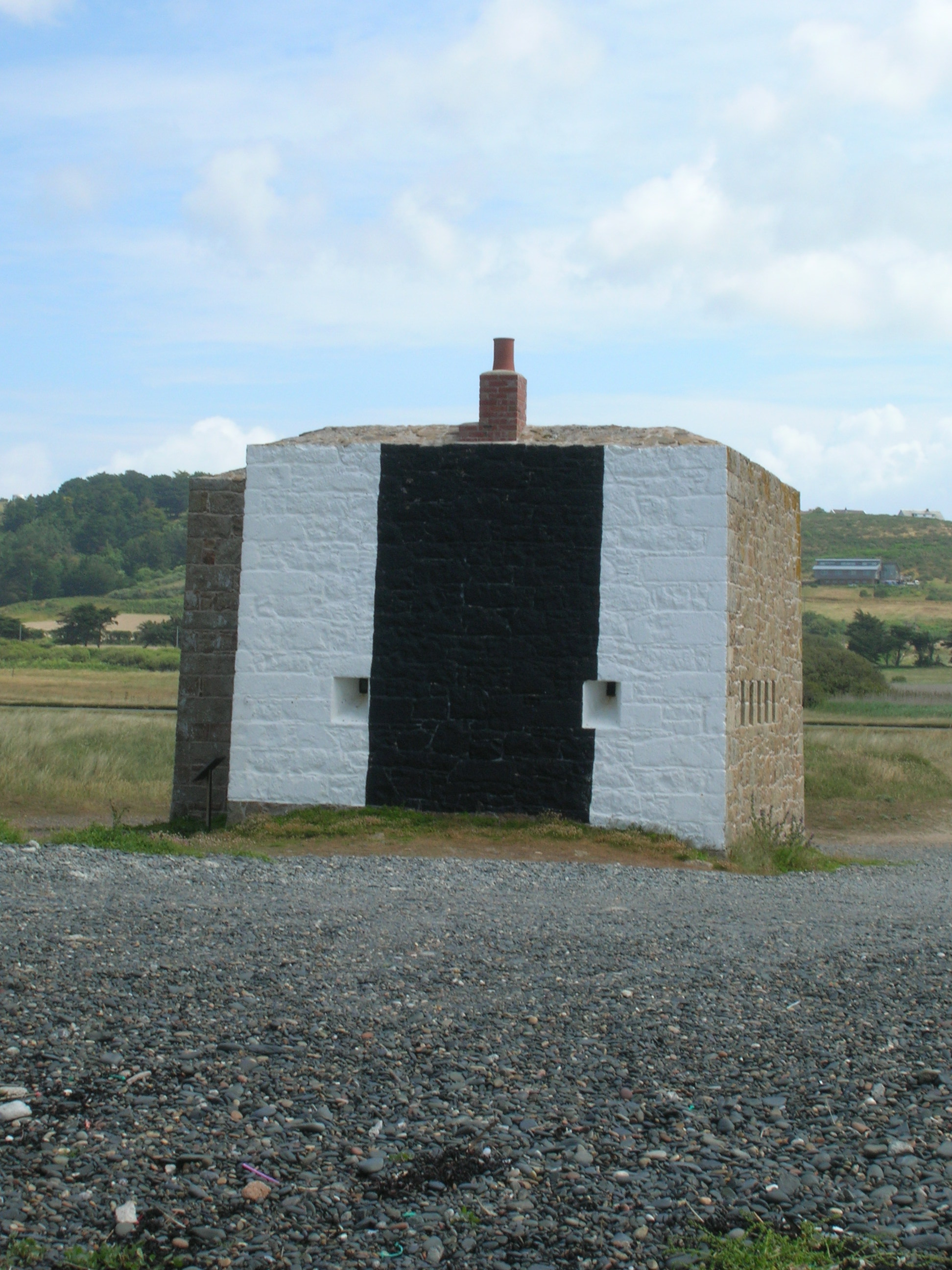
La Tour Cârrée

La Tour Cârrée, or The Square Tower, on Jersey, is not a tower but rather is a fortified guardhouse and magazine in the style of a blockhouse with loopholes for musketry. It may have been erected in 1778 on the site of a redoubt. The tower supported a battery of three 24-pounder cannons that stood on a paved surface in front of it. Shingle now covers this surface. The tower and battery played a role in the repelling in 1779 of the Prince of Nassau's attempt to land a force at the Franco-Dutch Invasion of Jersey.

Historically, the structure and redoubts near it have been known as Square Fort, North Battery, and New North Battery. It is located on St Ouen's Bay, by St Ouen's Pond.

Today the structure is painted white and black on the seaward side to serve as a daymark for sailors. Since 2007 the tower has been available as self-catering accommodation under a program the Jersey Heritage Trust administers for the States of Jersey Towers and Forts project. Accommodation is extremely basic as the site has no utilities whatsoever.
