= Yrjö Karilas =

Finnish writer

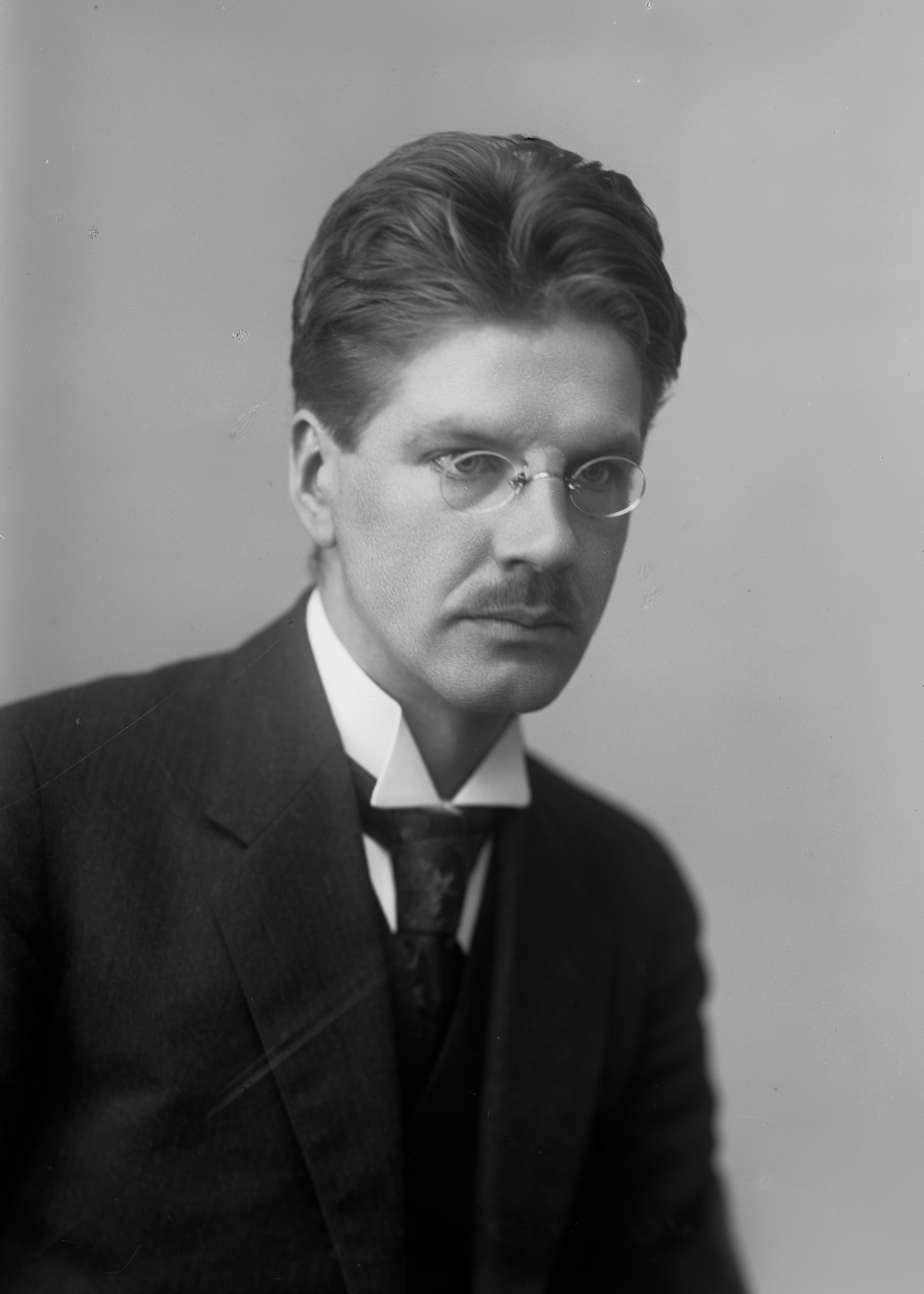
Yrjö Karilas in the 1910s.

Yrjö Antero Karilas (3 January 1891 – 7 June 1982) was a Finnish writer. He is most known for his Pikkujättiläinen book series.

== Short biography ==
Yrjö Karilas was born at Hailuoto on 3 January 1891. He passed his Matriculation examination in 1908. In 1911, he started teaching Russian at Helsinki. After the language was removed from the curriculum, he became an office employee at WSOY's Helsinki office. He oversaw the publication of multiple informative books, the most well-known being Pikkujättiläinen (literally "little giant"), published for the first time in 1924.

== Books ==
- Antero Vipunen; arvoitusten ja ongelmien, leikkien ja pelien sekä eri harrastusalojen pikku jättiläinen
- Koululaisen muistikirja IX
- Koululaisen muistikirja XXVI
- Koululaisen muistikirja XXVIII
- Mieleni minun tekevi; askartelun ja kokeilun, keräilyn ja retkeilyn sekä eri harrastusalojen pikku jättiläinen
