= Hailuoto Church =

- Finnish: Hailuodon kirkko Swedish: Karlö kyrka
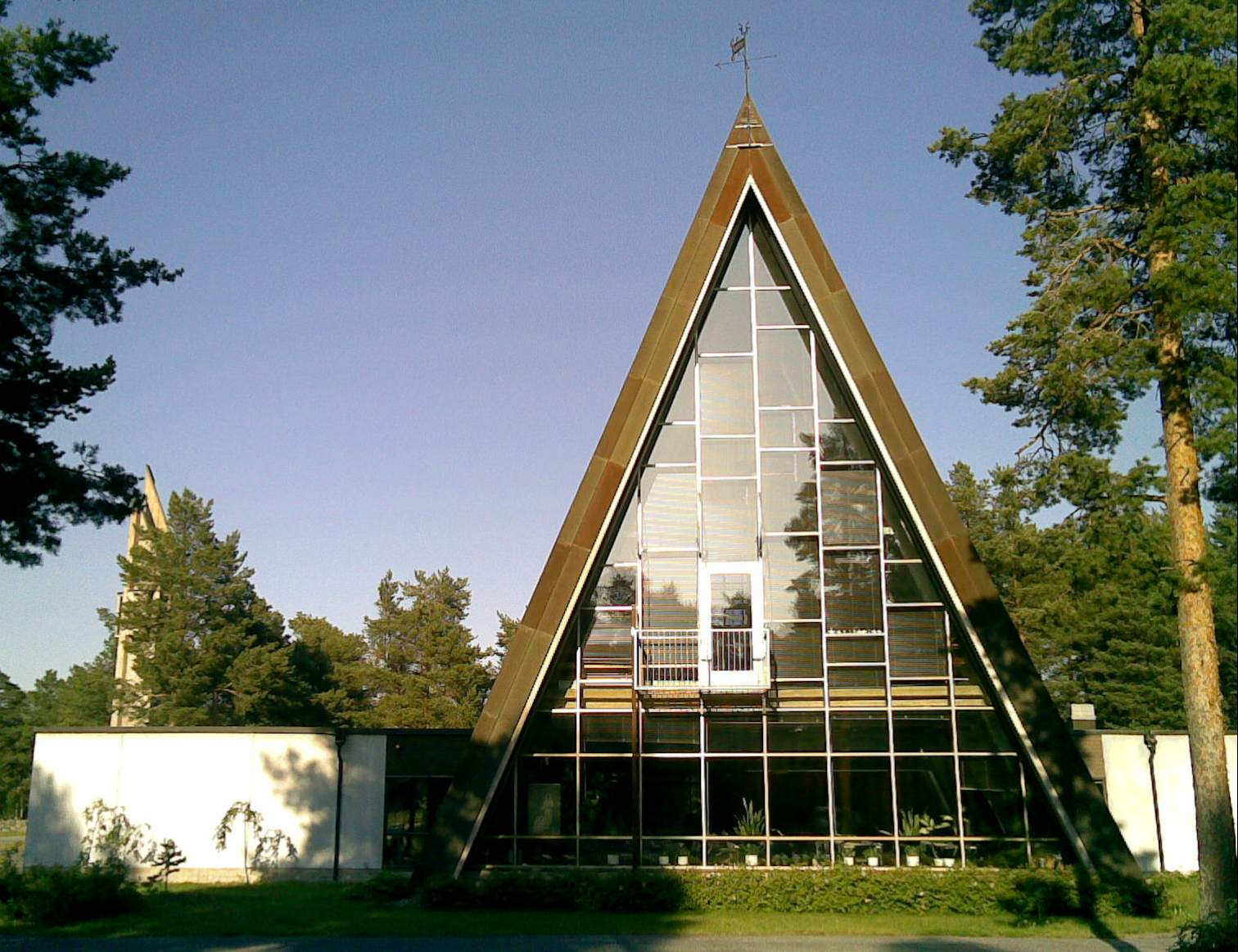
- Hailuoto Church
- 65°00′32″N 24°42′52″E
- Location: Hailuoto, North Ostrobothnia
- Country: Finland
- Website: www.hailuodonseurakunta.fi

Architecture
- Architect(s): Matti Aaltonen, Irma Aaltonen
- Completed: 1972; 54 years ago

Specifications
- Capacity: 200–300

Administration
- Diocese: Oulu
- Parish: Hailuoto

The Hailuoto Church (Finnish: Hailuodon kirkko; Swedish: Karlö kyrka) is the 1972 church located on the Hailuoto island in North Ostrobothnia, Finland. The church was designed by architects Irma and Matti Aaltonen. It is built of reinforced concrete and has a capacity of about 200–300. The church was built to replace the former church from 1620, which was destroyed by fire in 1968. A natural forest cemetery is located near the church.

The church's 11-tone pipe organ was made by the Kangasala's organ factory in the year the church was completed.
