= Kingswear Daymark =

Daymark in Devon, England

The Daymark
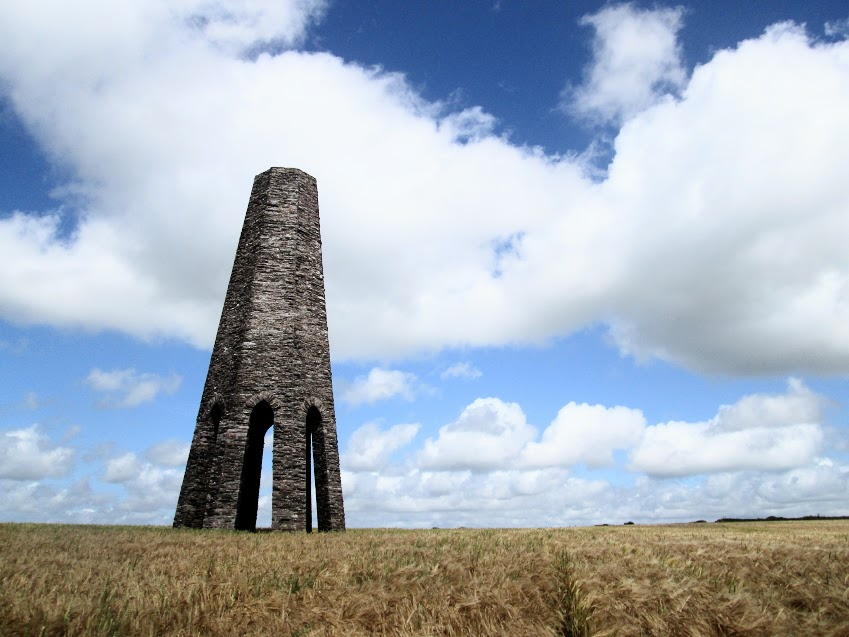
- The Daymark in summer

- Location within Devon
- Alternative names: The Tower

General information
- Type: Day beacon
- Location: Froward Point, Kingswear, England
- Coordinates: 50°20′32″N 3°32′33″W
- Elevation: 150 m (490 ft)
- Completed: 1864
- Owner: Dart Harbour Commissioners

Height
- Height: 24 m (79 ft)

Technical details
- Material: Limestone and Slate

Design and construction
- Designations: Grade II listed building

Kingswear Daymark (also known as The Tower) is a 24 m (80 ft) octagonal limestone day beacon built in 1864, in an arable field above Froward Point near the town of Kingswear, Devon, England.

== Description ==
The daymark was constructed of local limestone and slate in an arable field. It is octagonal and sharply battered with a truncated open top, and has a tall narrow pointed head arch on each side, forming eight stilted pillars.

== Construction ==
In 1863, Charles Seale Hayne, owner of Brownstone at that time, became a founder member of the Dartmouth Harbour Commission whose main aim was to improve access and facilities to Dartmouth harbour. The following year, Seale Hayne leased land for the erection of this tower as a day beacon.

== See also ==
- Landmark
