= Great Tower Neuwerk =

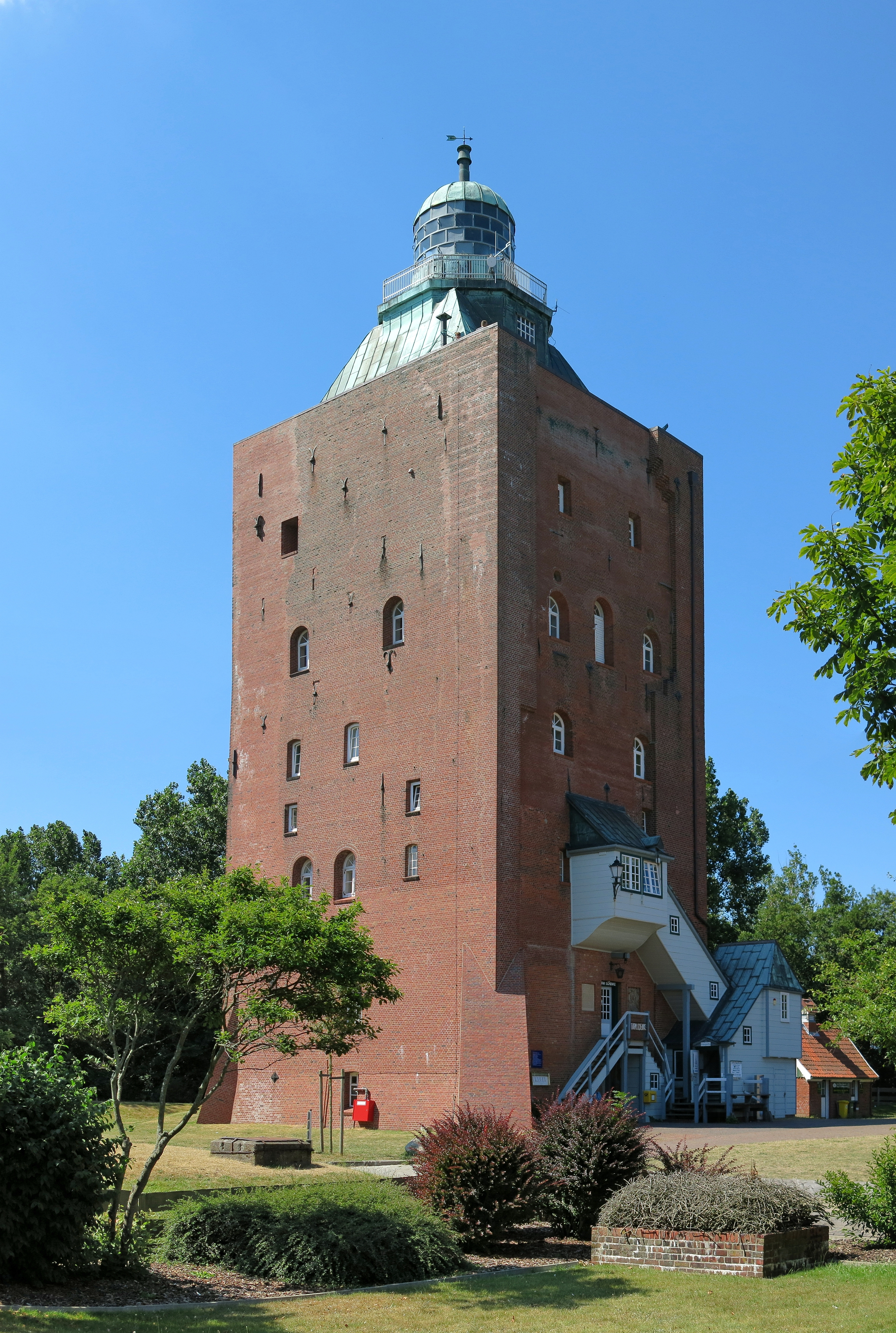
- Location: Neuwerk, German Bight
- Coordinates: 53°54′54.8″N 8°29′45″E

Tower
- Constructed: 1310 (first)
- Construction: brick tower
- Height: 39 metres (128 ft)
- Shape: square tower with lantern placed at the centre of a square pyramidal roof
- Markings: red brick, greenish lantern
- Power source: light-emitting diode, Argand lamp, kerosene lamp, incandescent light bulb, halogen lamp
- Operator: Nationalpark Hamburgisches Wattenmeer
- Heritage: heritage monument in Hamburg

Light
- First lit: 1814
- Deactivated: 2014
- Focal height: 38 metres (125 ft)
- Range: 16 nautical miles (30 km)
- Characteristic: until February 2014: LFl.(3) WRG 20 s now: F.

The Great Tower Neuwerk is a historical building located on Neuwerk island, belonging to Hamburg. Completed in 1310, the structure is one of the oldest worldwide that was used as lighthouse (1814–2014) and still standing. This former beacon, watchtower and lighthouse is also the oldest building in Hamburg and oldest secular building on the German coast.

== History ==
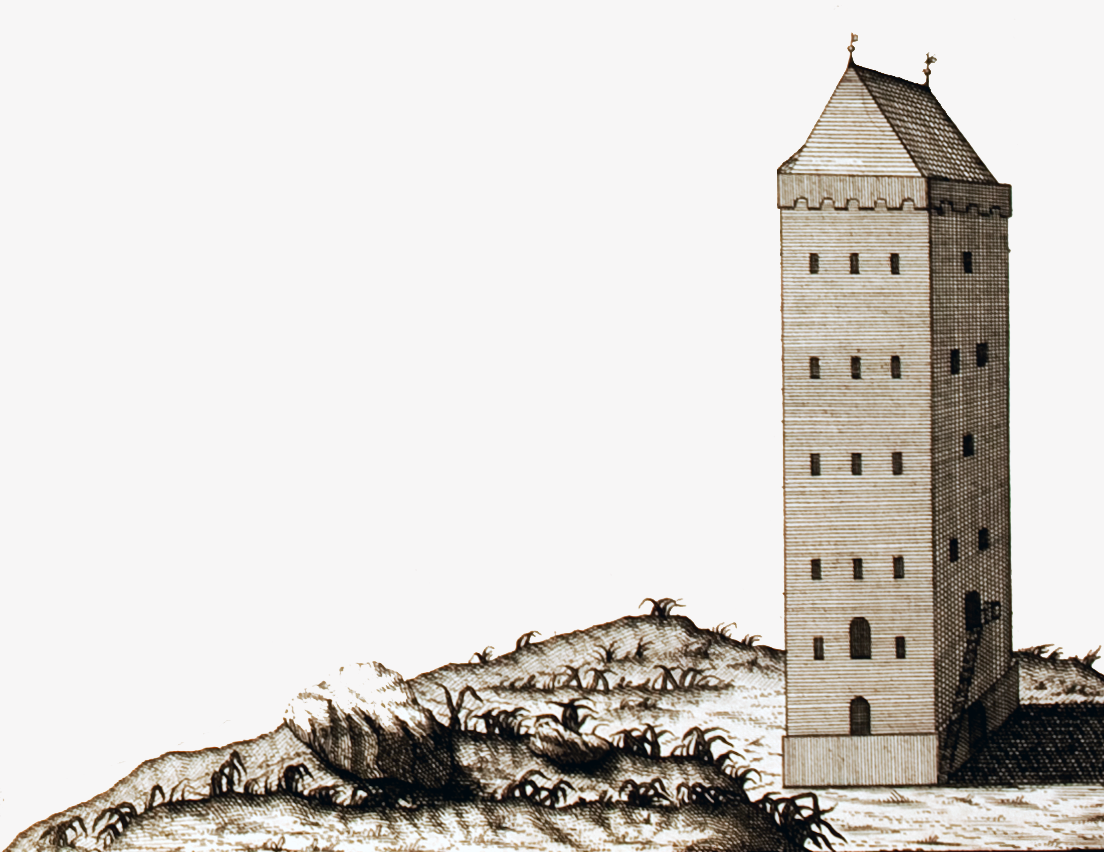
Neuwerk Tower (1751), before it was turned into the "Great Lighthouse".

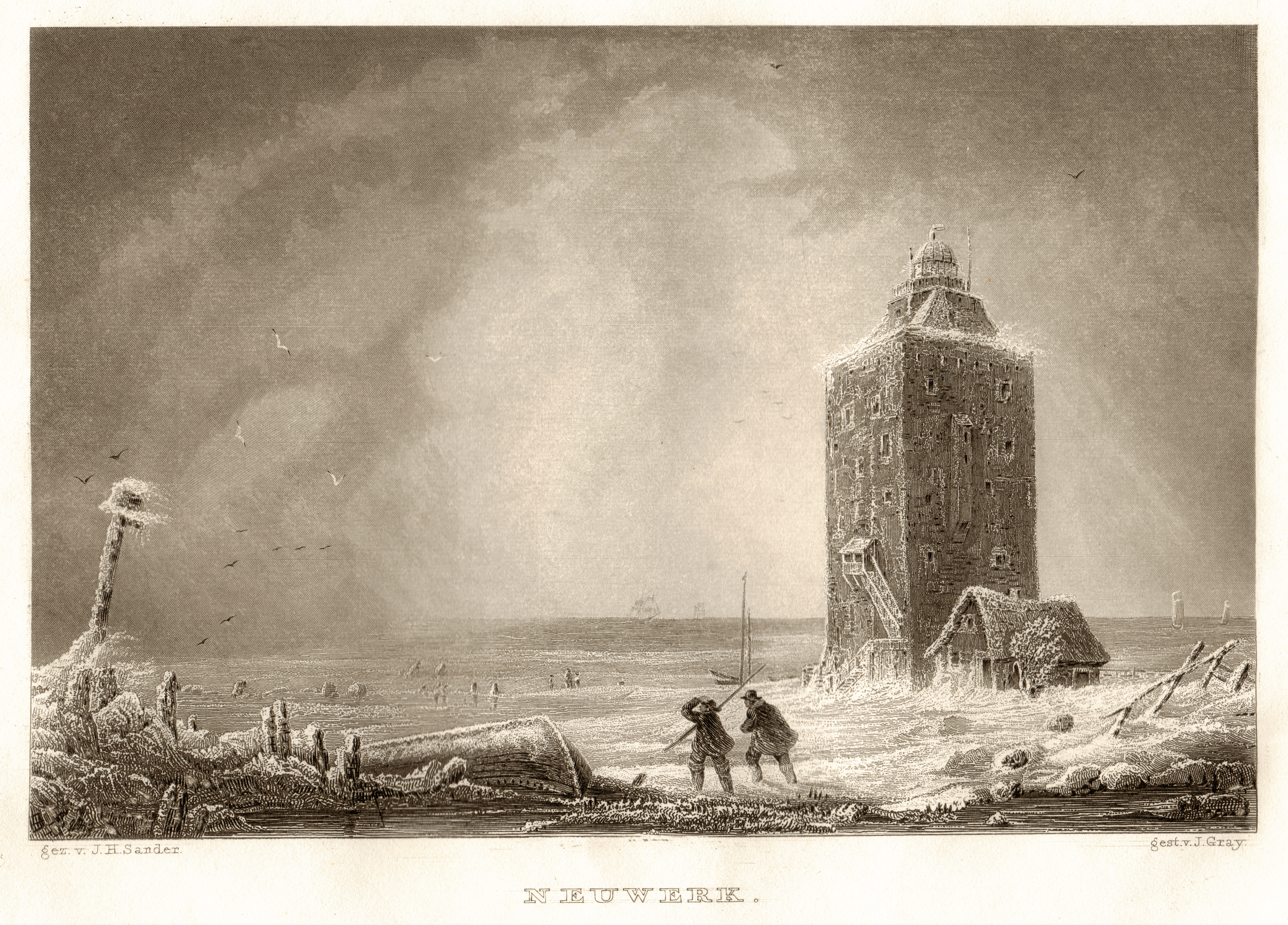
Neuwerk Tower at storm surge (around 1840)

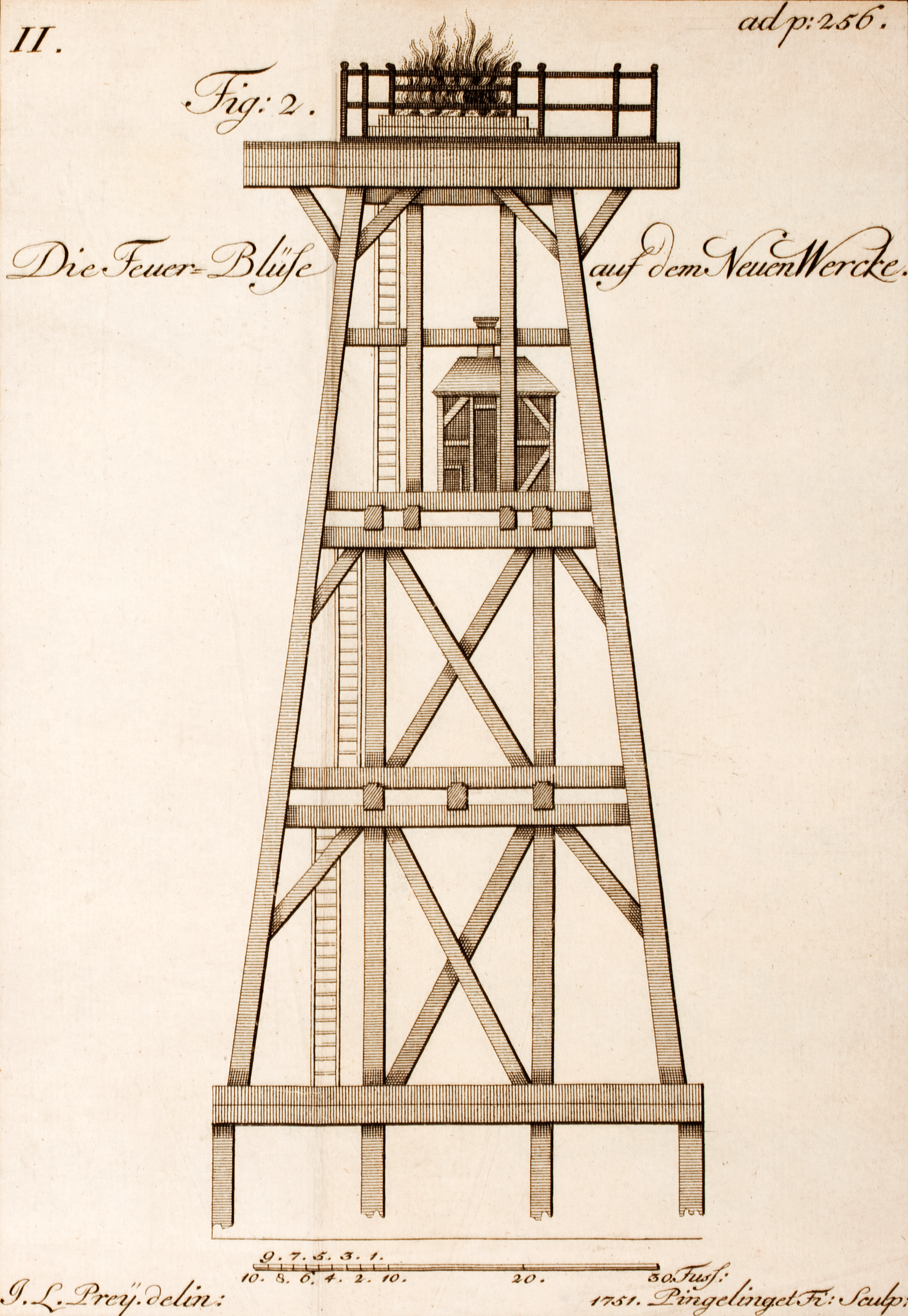
Feuerblüse Neuwerk (first erected 1644)

The construction of the 'new werk' was started in 1300. It was completed after ten years in 1310. The style of a keep matches the common Norman tower type of the time. Contrary to some literature, the tower was built in this form from the beginning. The fire in the 1360s destroyed most of the wooden elements and it had to undergo major reconstruction.

The original roof was made of lead, and was replaced by copper in 1474. This was again replaced in 1558 by a tiled roof and by a new copper roof following that. The copper was then used for military purposes in 1916 reconstructed later.

The original purpose was to host troops to defend the ships entering and leaving the Elbe from sea and beach pirates. The tower was also refuge for the farmers on the island during storm surges and survivors of shipwrecks over the centuries.

The tower marked the most northern measuring point for the triangulation of the Kingdom of Hannover by Carl Friedrich Gauss in July 1825. Parts of this triangulation net were depicted on the back of last series of the 10 Deutsche Mark note (1989–2001).

The tower of Neuwerk is officially Hamburg's oldest building. A church in Sinstorf is actually older, but only part of Hamburg since the Greater Hamburg Act of 1937.

The tower is protected under cultural heritage management since 1924 and the surrounding dwelling hill since 1971. It is used as viewpoint, guesthouse and restaurant.

=== Lighthouse ===
Before the tower was turned into a lighthouse in 1814, the dangerous reef and sandbank of Scharhörn was marked by multiple beacons and bearing aids, most importantly the Scharhörnbake. The most important was the bearing of wooden beacons north-west end of Neuwerk and its tower to find the smaller beacon in the open sea. The late "Nord-Bake" (destroyed 2017) showed this form of a beacon to overshadow an open fire once the ships reached this bearing. The Carta Marina shows a fire beacon on "Nuge uirk" as early as 1539, but other sources mention the open coal fire beacon not until 1644: It was a navigational aid during night time. This required 1000 tons of imported Scottish coal a year starting from 1761. This coal contained more bitumen and burned much brighter than the usual German hard coal.

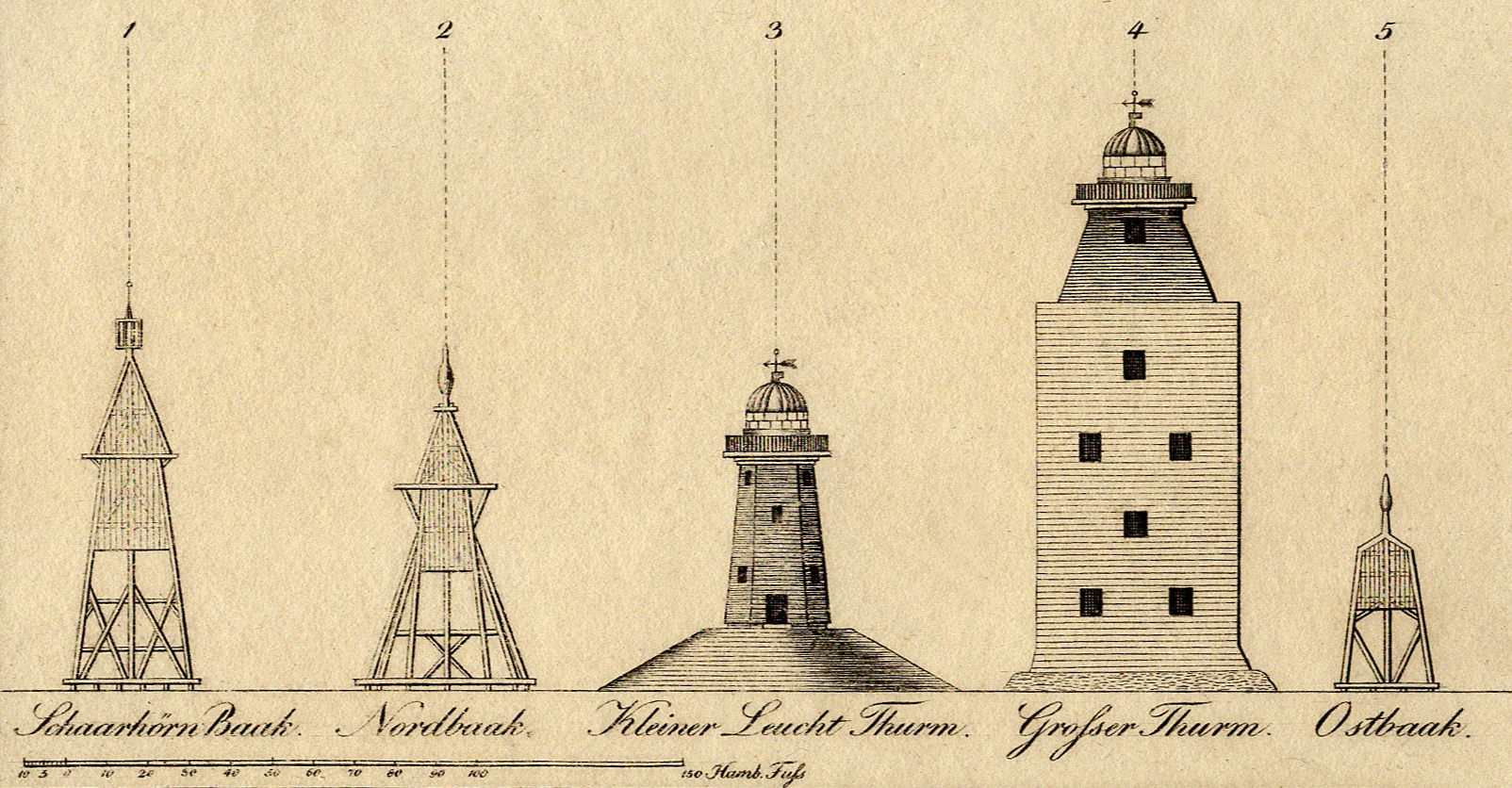
The towers and beacons of Neuwerk (1825/1831)

The tower was only turned into a lighthouse on 20 December 1814. The first lamp was made of 21 hollow wick oil lamps with parabolic reflectors and burned on colza oil and kerosene starting 1870. A fresnel lens of measuring a focal length of 700 mm was installed 1892 together with a five-wick kerosene lamp, to improve the brightness even further. This lens is still used today. The lamp was again improved in 1908, to be first electrified in 1942. Electricity was needed to shut down the light quickly during World War II. The kerosene lamp were kept in place as there was no emergency power supply and upgraded to propane in 1949. The luminous intensity was stated in 1952 to be 5700 Hefner lamps (HK) 13200 seaside, 1000 for the green and 550 for the red light. The reach of the 1000 watt lamp was roughly 30 kilometers. It could be seen from Heligoland under good conditions. The classic electric lamp was replaced by a Halogen lamp in autumn 2007. On 10 February 2014 it was replaced by LED.

Although belonging to Hamburg, the lighthouse was operated by the Wasser- und Schifffahrtsamt Cuxhaven, which is responsible for the Elbe estuary. As the lighthouse was non-essential for shipping it was decommissioned on 1 January 2014 and turned over to the Hamburg Port Authority. On 10 February 2014 it was officially shut down after almost 200 years in operation and continues as a "private light" under the authority of Hamburg. The original light characteristic "Blk. (3) w. r. gn. 20 s 16–11 sm" was switched to a steady white lamp with a reach of barely 3 nautical miles.

The original open coal beacon was replaced by the small lighthouse after the great lighthouse started operating and functioned together with him as leading lights. This allowed for safe passage from north-west over the Vogelsandsteert. The forementioned open fire beacon, the great and small lighthouses and today's "Nord-Bake" all were established on the same bearing. The small lighthouse was torn down in 1909.

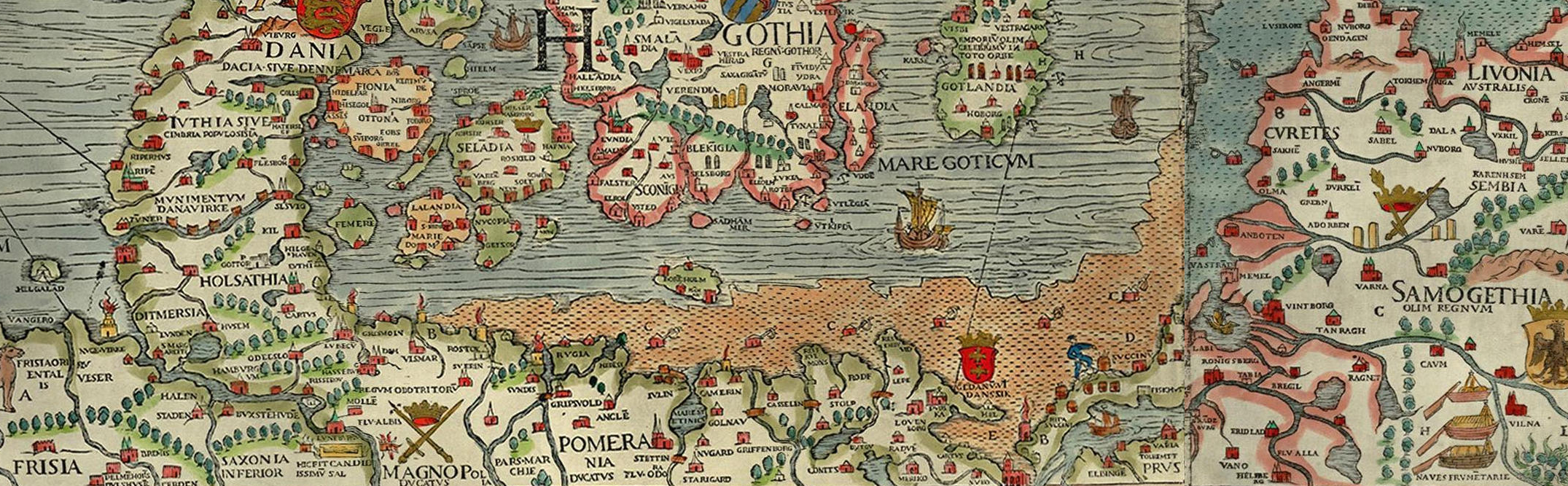
Fire beacons Neuwerk („Nuge uirk“), Lübeck, Wismar, Rostock, Cammin, Danzig and Riga in the Carta Marina (1539)

=== Usage ===
Apart from the floors for the guesthouse for the Hamburg state guests, the tower is home to the warden, a restaurant and their personnel. The former teacher Heinrich Gechter initiated the use as a hostel for schools of Winterhude in 1920, which switched to the neighboring barn 1924. The attic was also home the bird warden from the Verein Jordsand for many years. In the 1600s Royal Protestant Imperial Count Palatine Johann Rist resided at Neuwerk.

== Gallery ==
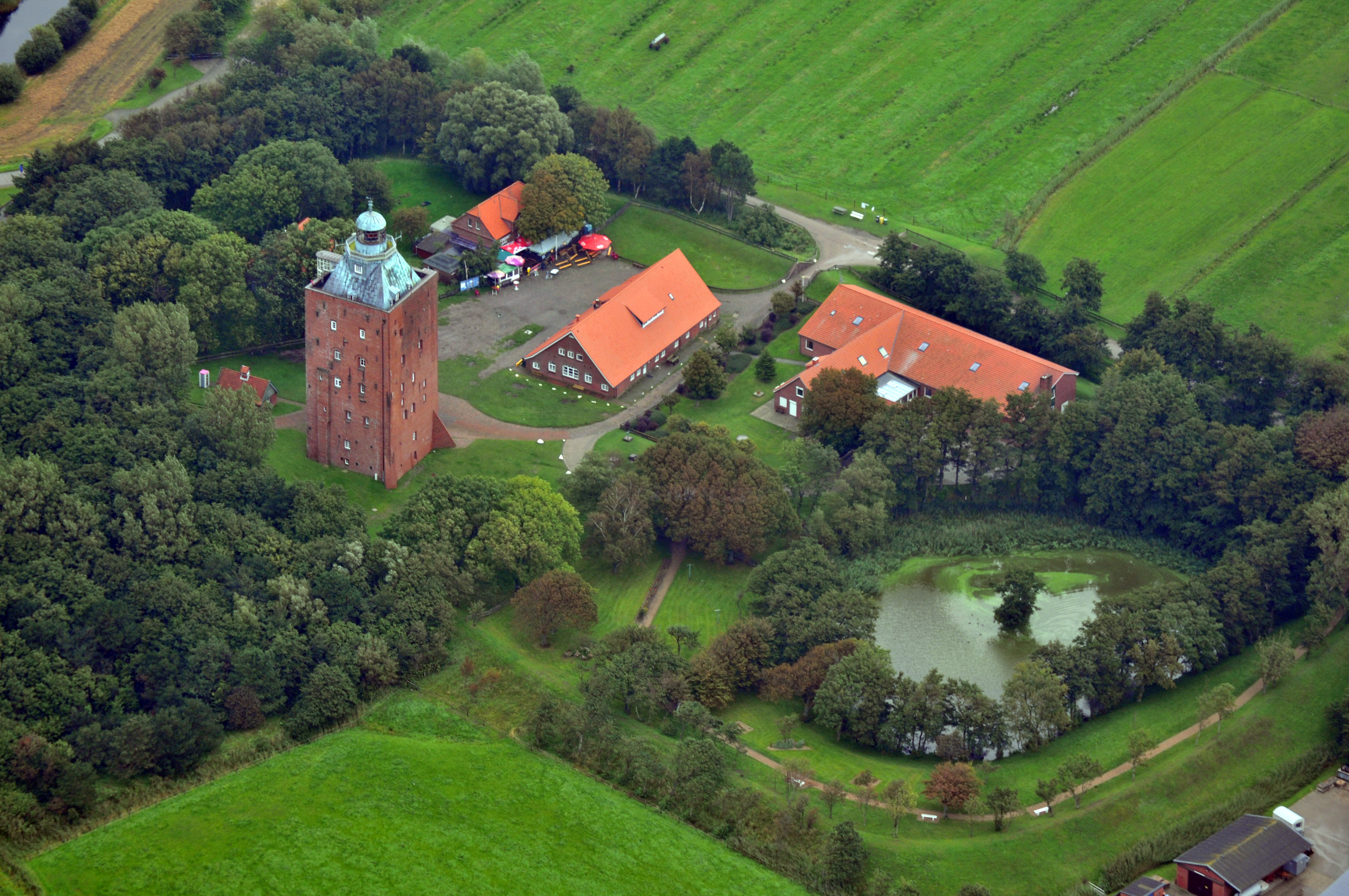
Aerial view of the artificial dwelling hill and tower

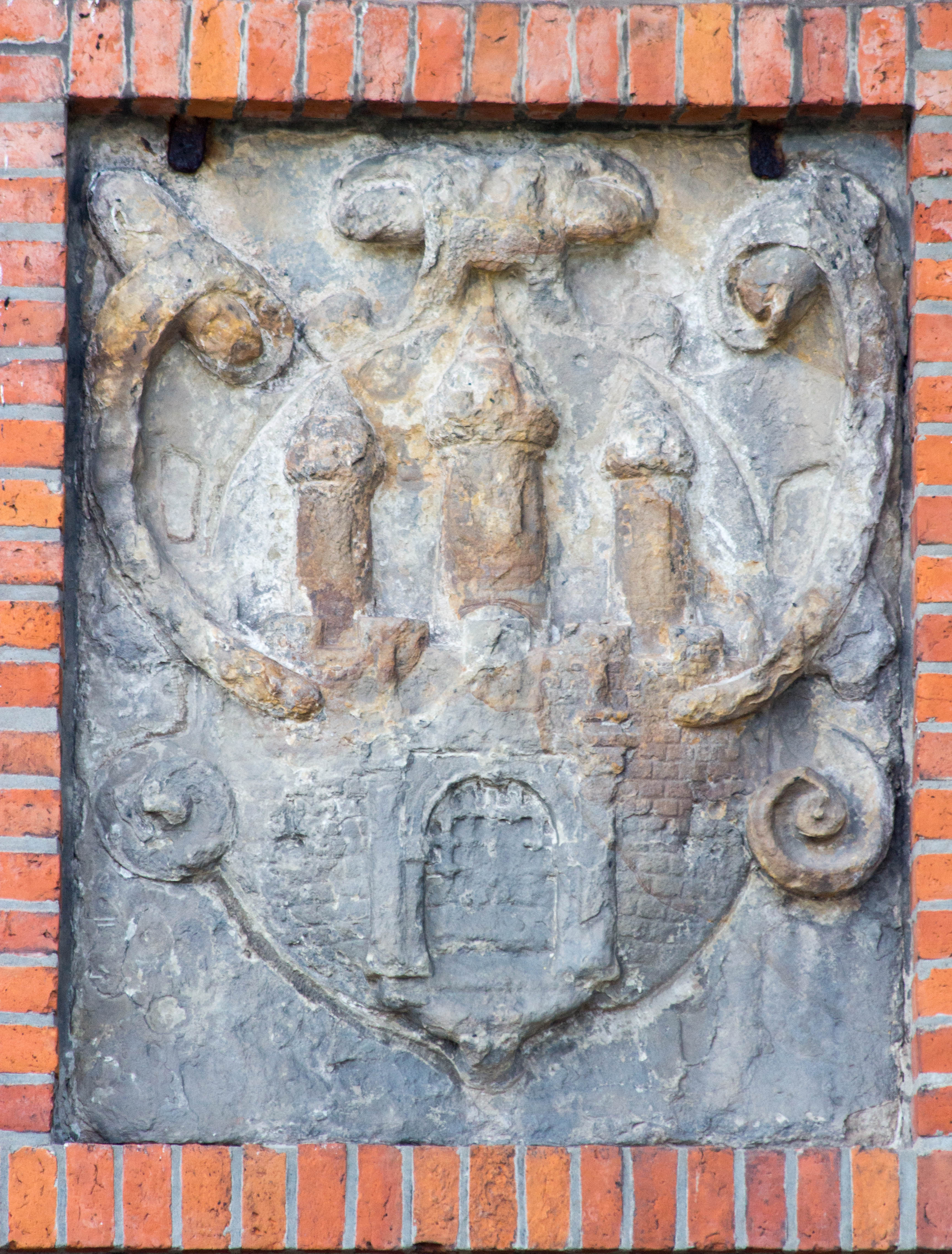
Coat of arms of Hamburg, to the right of the entrance

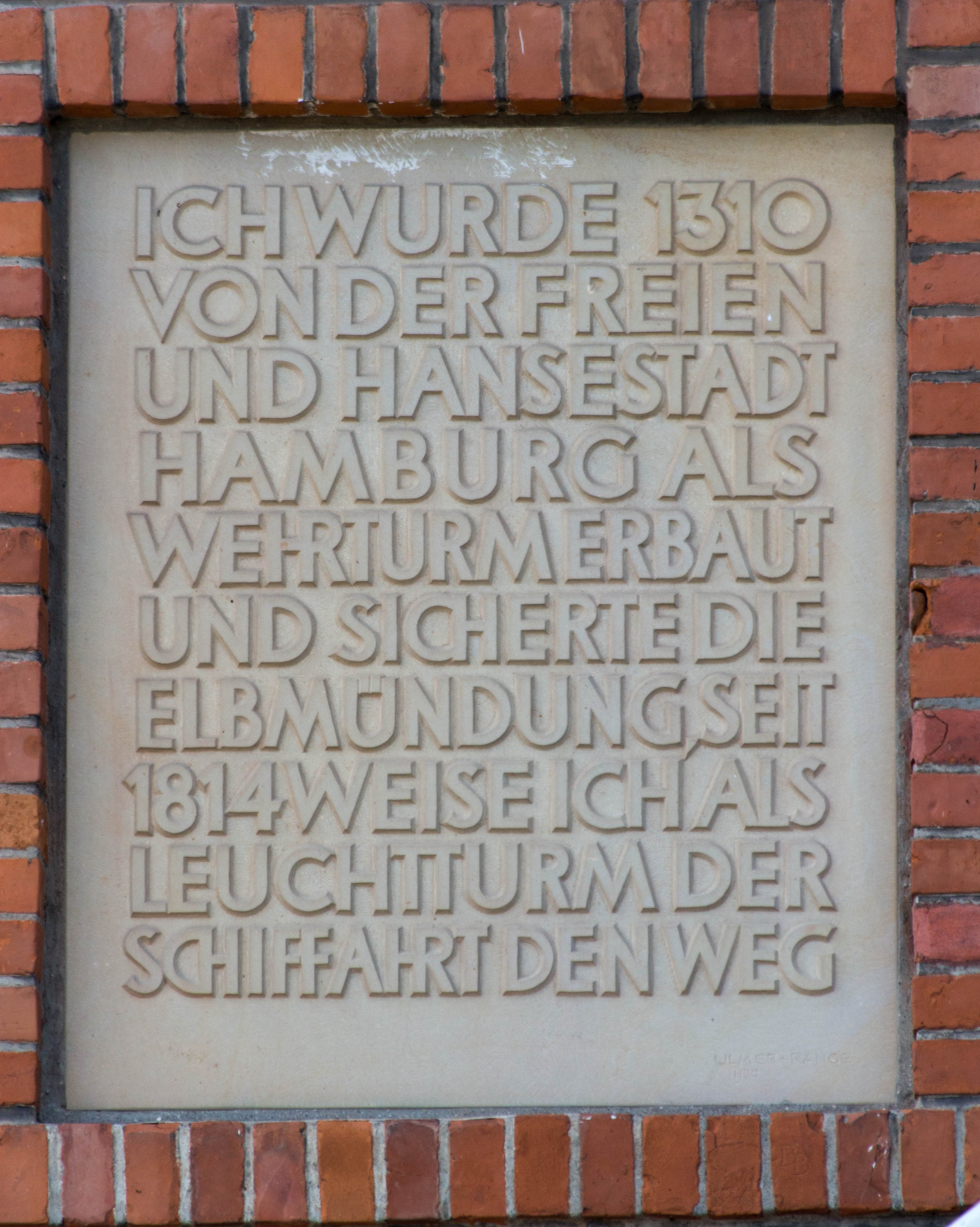
Inscription to the left of the entrance

== See also ==
- List of lighthouses in Germany
