= Blüse Neuwerk =

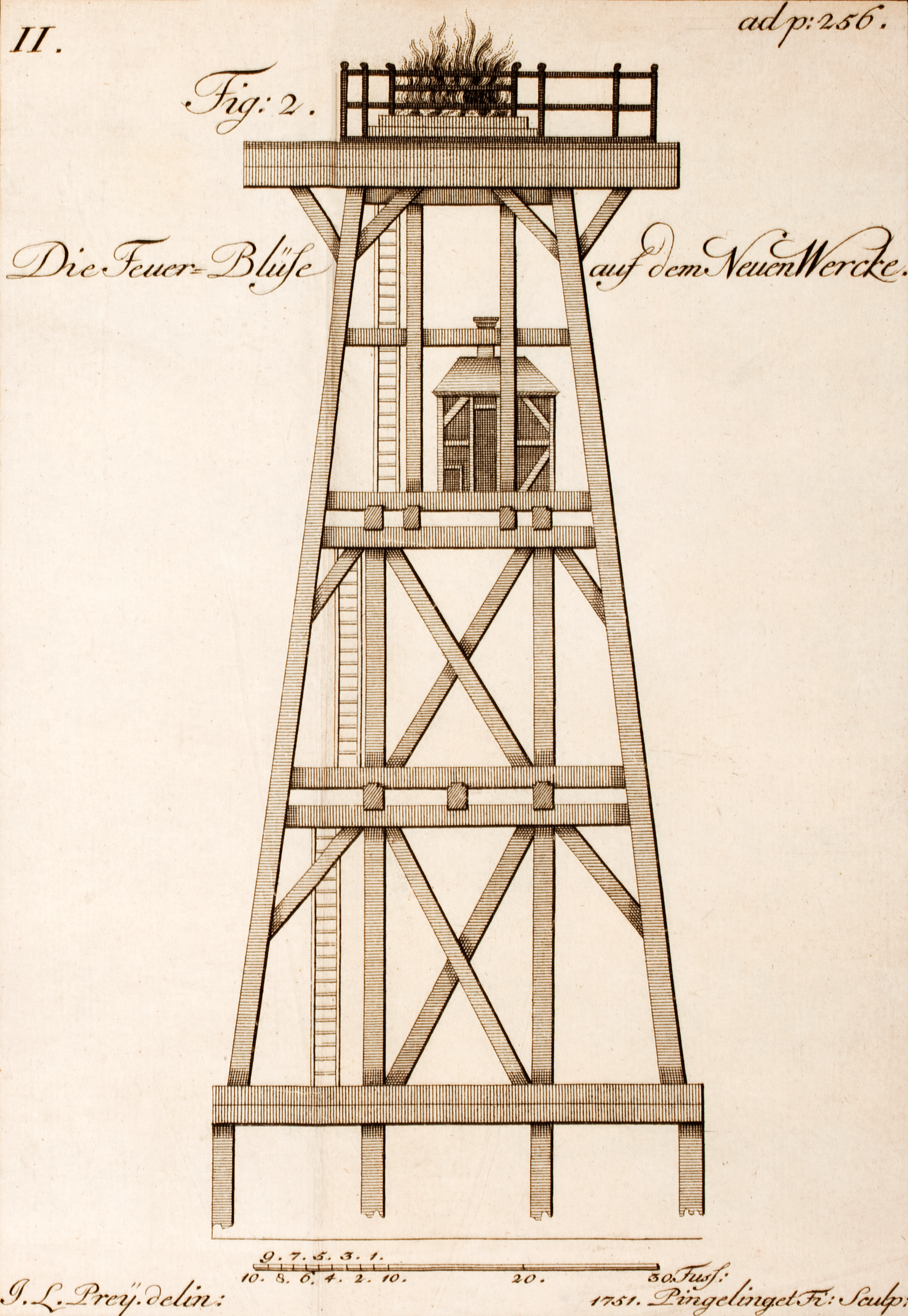
- Drawing of the Blüse, made by Johann Leonhard Prey for Jacob Schuback, drawn by Jonas Haas, engraved by Gottfried Christian and Thomas Albrecht Pingeling. (1751)
- Location: Neuwerk, German Bight
- Coordinates: 53°55′19.546″N 8°29′14.485″E

Tower
- Constructed: 1644
- Construction: wooden structure
- Height: 23 metres (75 ft)
- Shape: square, three storie structure with an open coal fire on top
- Power source: bituminous coal
- Operator: Hamburger Admiralität

Light
- First lit: 1644
- Deactivated: 1815
- Focal height: 22 m (72 ft)
- Characteristic: FW

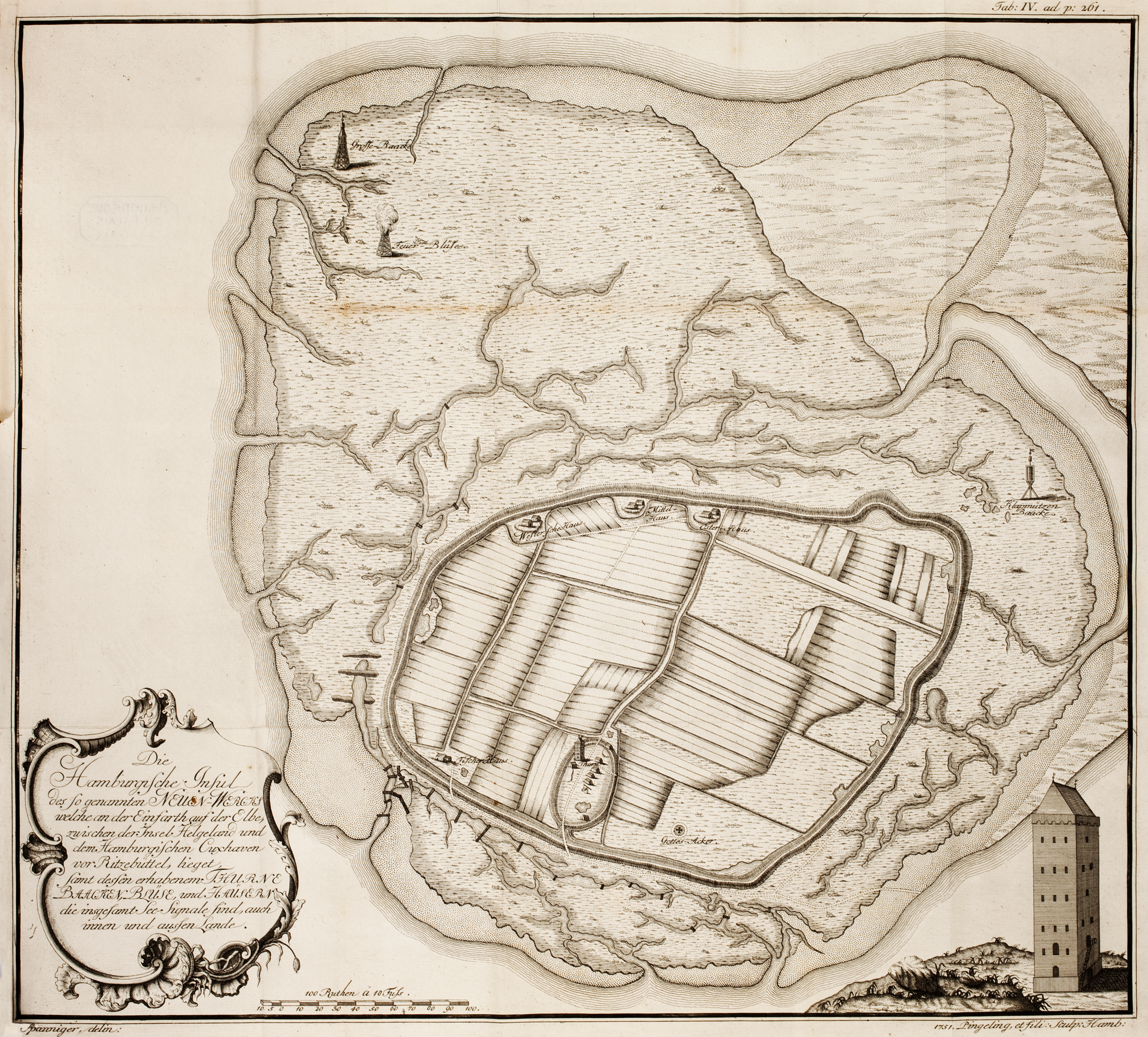
The Blüse (top-left corner) behind the great (or north) daymark and further daymarks on Neuwerk.

The Blüse Neuwerk (also called Feuerblüse) was built in 1644 by the city of Hamburg on the island Neuwerk. Together with the other beacons and the Great Tower Neuwerk, which was just a fortification at the time, it was the first lighthouse in the Elbe estuary and, after the Blüse Helgoland (1630) and Wangerooge (1631), the third on the German North Sea coast.

The wooden frame was remarkably high for the time and was erected in the northwestern shore of the island. When its position was threatened by erosion of the shoreline at the beginning of the 19th century, it was replaced by a wooden lighthouse behind the dyke in 1814.

The bearing together with the 1310 erected Great Tower Neuwerk (lighthouse since 1814) led sailors to the Schartonne near Scharhörn. The northern daymark, somewhat further seawards, obscured the fire of the Blüse on that bearing.

Olaus Magnus already depicted a lighthouse in 1539 on Neuwerk in his Carta Marina, however such a mark is still missing on Melchior Lorck's much more detailed map of the Elbe from 1568.

== Construction ==
A three-part ladder under the platform led to the so-called guard house, a small room for the warden. On the platform itself stood the large fire grate. To protect the wooden structure from the open fire, a layer of clay, sand and a brick pavement on top covered the wooden planks.

A replica of the Blüse Neuwerk stood from 1979 to 1994 in the German Maritime Museum in Bremerhaven.

== Operations ==
In the beginning the coal fire was only operated between September 29 and March 31, from the beginning of the 18th century the season went from September 14 to April 30, and starting 1735 from September 1 onwards.

For the year-round operation from 1761 onwards, 1000 tons of hard coal were needed. Hamburg imported the coal directly from Scotland until 1771, which produced a brighter fire than hard coal from Germany. The coal was then sourced from Hamburg. Hamburg built its own coal galiote and maintained a coal port near the beacon. From 1673, the ship also supplied hard coal to the Hamburg-operated Blüse on Helgoland.

The warden ran the Blüse together with two servants and initially earned only 30 talers a year, from 1656 50 talers, from 1692 530 Lübische Mark and from 1695 650 Lübische Mark.

The operation was suspended from 1807 to 1813, but there were further interruptions due to ice drift and when the wooden structure caught fire in 1724 and 1794, despite having extinguishing water on the platform at all times.

The wardens on Neuwerk
From	To	Warden of the Blüse
	1688	Jacob von Goldbeck
1688	1710	Joseph von Goldbeck
1710	1719	Peter Tode (also baliff)
1719	1726	Johann Hinrich Voss (also baliff))
1726	1727	Peter Voss
1727	1732	Thomas Untenberg
1732	1759	Magnus Wilckens I.
1759	1765	Magnus Wilckens II.
		?
1773	1783	David Wilhelm Kühlstein
1783	1805	Christian Wichmann
1805	1815	Claus Schmidt (also first light keeper on the Great Tower starting 1815)

== See also ==
- List of lighthouses in Germany
