= Hailuoto =

Hailuoto Karlö
- Municipality
- Hailuodon kunta Karlö kommun
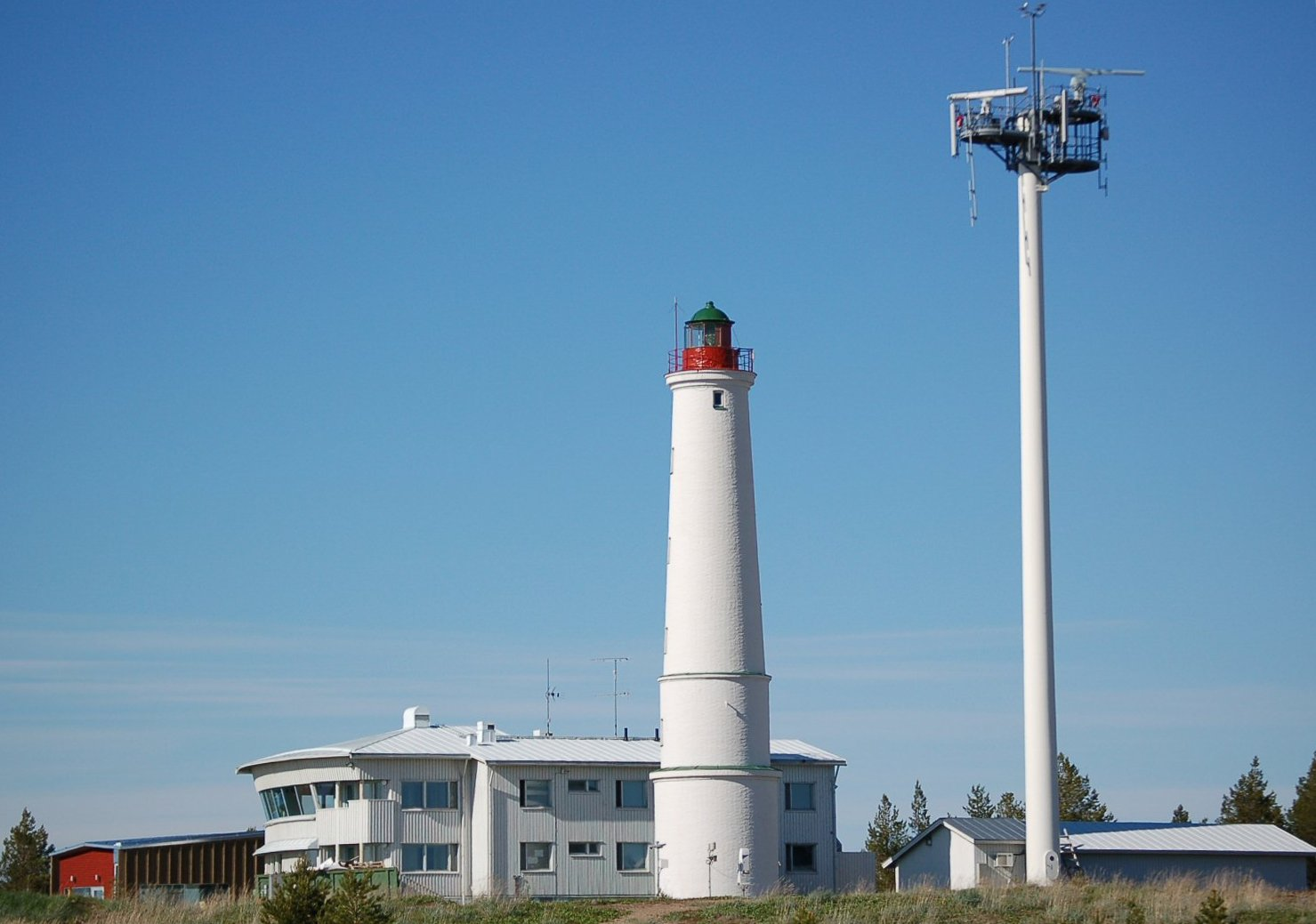
- Pilot station, lighthouse, and radar antenna in Marjaniemi

- Coat of arms

- Location of Hailuoto in Finland
- Interactive map of Hailuoto
- Coordinates: 65°01′N 024°43′E
- Country: Finland
- Region: North Ostrobothnia
- Sub-region: Oulu
- Founded: 1587

Government
  - Municipal manager: Ari Nurkkala

Area (2018-01-01)
  - Total: 1,082.70 km^{2} (418.03 sq mi)
  - Land: 205.65 km^{2} (79.40 sq mi)
  - Water: 882.17 km^{2} (340.61 sq mi)
  - Rank: 261st largest in Finland

Population (2025-12-31)
  - Total: 912
  - Rank: 297th largest in Finland
  - Density: 4.43/km^{2} (11.5/sq mi)

Population by native language
  - Finnish: 98.4% (official)
  - Others: 1.6%

Population by age
  - 0 to 14: 12.8%
  - 15 to 64: 48.4%
  - 65 or older: 38.9%
- Time zone: UTC+02:00 (EET)
  - Summer (DST): UTC+03:00 (EEST)
- Website: www.hailuoto.fi

Ramsar Wetland
- Official name: Bird Wetlands of Hailuoto Island
- Designated: 2 February 2004
- Reference no.: 1505

Hailuoto (Finnish: [ˈhɑi̯ˌluo̯to]; Swedish: Karlö) is a Finnish island in the northern Baltic Sea and a municipality in Northern Ostrobothnia region. The population of Hailuoto is 912 (December 31, 2025), making it the smallest municipality in Northern Ostrobothnia and the former Oulu Province in terms of population. The municipality covers an area of 205.65 km^{2} (79.40 sq mi) (excluding sea areas) of which 1.70 km^{2} (0.66 sq mi) is inland water (January 1, 2018). The population density is 4.43/km^{2} (11.5/sq mi). Of all the Finnish sea islands, Hailuoto is the third largest after Fasta Åland and Kimitoön.

Hailuoto lies opposite the city of Oulu in the Gulf of Bothnia. The distance between Oulu and Hailuoto is 53 kilometres (33 mi), and the sea area between them is called Luodonselkä (literally "open water of the islet").

Land in the region is constantly rising due to post-glacial rebound. It is estimated that the first parts of Hailuoto appeared from the Baltic Sea about 1700 years ago. The current island of Hailuoto was formed from many smaller islands. Two large sections, Santonen and Hanhinen merged into the main island (Luoto) only about two centuries ago. The island is continuously expanding and eventually it will join with the mainland. Kirkkosalmi, a wetland region between Hanhinen and Luoto is renowned for being an important bird refuge where rare bird species are observed.

The theme of the coat of arms of Hailuoto describes the economy of the island municipality; the explanation of the coat of arms is "in a blue field with a silver rowlock." The coat of arms was designed by Teuvo-Pentti Pakkala and approved by the Hailuoto Municipal Council at its meeting on 28 April 1966. The Ministry of the Interior approved the use of the coat of arms on 19 December of the same year.

== History ==
The permanent settlement of Hailuoto apparently began in the 12th century. Residents came from many directions, especially from Karelia. The Swedes, who competed for its fishing waters, gave the island the name Karelö (which was transformed into Karlö), which means freely translated "Karelian Island". The first permanent residents of Hailuoto were mostly from Western Finland, but some also came from Eastern Finland. In 1548, there were 43 houses on the island, and by 1570 the number of houses had grown to 60. Queen Christina of Sweden donated the entire island of Hailuoto in 1652 to Colonel Berndt Taube, from whose heirs it was returned to the crown in 1675.

Hailuoto first belonged to the high parish of Saloinen (nowadays part of Raahe), from which it separated into an independent parish in 1587. The church, built in 1610–1620, was for a long time the oldest wooden church in use in Finland until it burned down in 1968. The current church was completed in 1972.

During the Great Famine of 1695–1697, 88 inhabitants of Hailuoto died. During the Great Northern War (1713–1721), 200 Cossacks of the Tsardom of Russia killed about 800 people in Hailuoto with axes on 29 September 1714, on so called "Murder Friday" (Murhaperjantai). Many of the victims had sought protection on the island, as Hailuoto had a population of less than 300 at that time. The bloodshed done overnight was the greatest of the Great Northern War. According to tradition, the bells of Hailuoto Church were drowned in Lake Kirkonjärvi during the Great Northern War, where they were never found again.

== Geography and nature ==
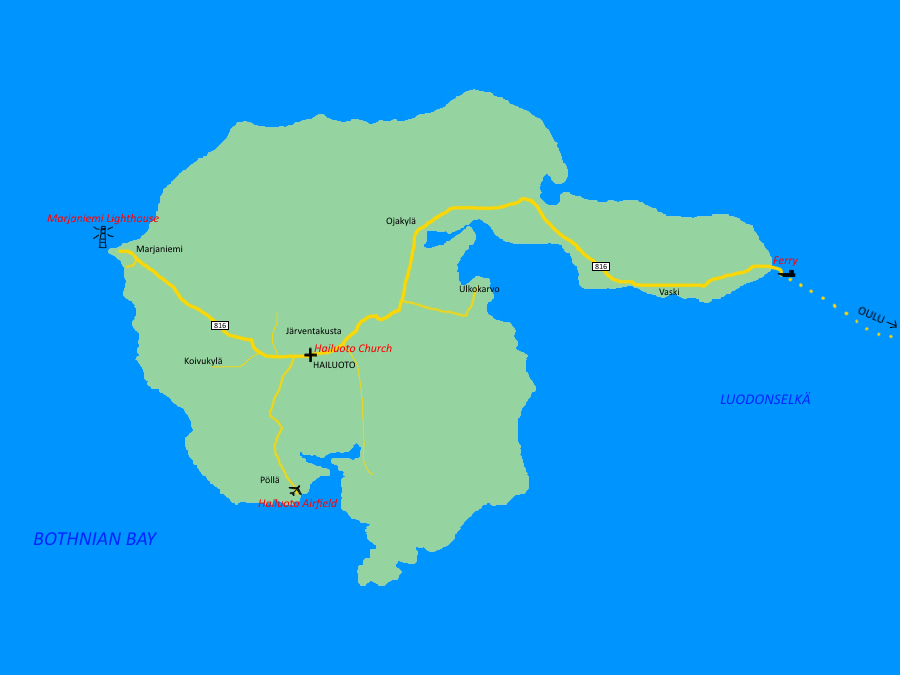
A map of Hailuoto

Hailuoto is the largest island in the Gulf of Bothnia, consisting of four parts, Luoto, Santonen, Hanhinen and Syökari. They were still separated a couple of centuries ago until they joined together as a result of crustal rebound. The young surface forms of the island are shaped throughout by sea waves, currents, ice thrust and wind.

The soil consists of sandy materials, which are partly derived from clay sandstone, which is called The formation of Muhos extends to Hailuoto. A 15-kilometer-long grayling ridge runs through the island from Hyypänmäki to Marjaniemi in a north-east-southwest direction. In the eastern parts of Hyypänmäki, the meltwater of the glacier has broken up the sand into a plateau almost two kilometers wide. In the central parts, Harju runs only a few ten-meter-wide high ridges, but spreads west from Isomäki again. The quarry Marjaniemi tip is a wear residue of the heart of the ridge. The highest point is Hyypänmäki which is about 31 meters above sea level. There are also rocks in the Hyypänmäki area, which are later covered with dry quicksand. The rocks show that the waves washed the shores of the islands, but the cliff ramparts also show that the drift ice pushed violently against the shores. Aerial sand dikes and shore dikes are a special feature that characterizes the surface forms of Hailuoto, especially on the north and west coasts.

The most diverse part of Hailuoto's vegetation is spread on the shores, especially in the coastal meadows of sheltered coves. In forest nature, dry pine barrens are well represented. Extensive lichen fabrics are particularly characteristic. Hailuoto, a bird research site, has a long tradition. Waterfowl are most abundant in meadows, extensive shallows, reefs and lush bays. The highlight of the fall is the migration of swans, which culminates in one and a half thousand birds resting on the shores.

In November 2019, a rare phenomenon was observed on the shores of Marjaniemi in Hailuoto, when thousands of "egg-shaped" sea ice had accumulated on the shore. BBC Weather expert George Goodfellow explained the reason for the phenomenon: "The general picture is that they form from pieces of larger ice sheet which then get jostled around by waves, making them rounder. They can grow when sea water freezes on to their surfaces and this also helps to make them smoother. So the result is a ball of smooth ice which can then get deposited on to a beach, either blown there or getting left there when the tide goes out."

=== Islands ===
- Hailuoto (main island)
- Hoikanriisi
- Isomatala
- Kengänkari
- Mustakivi
- Santosenkari
- Pikku-Hoikka
- Ulkoriisi
- Ulkolaidanmatala
- Väliteonkarit

=== Villages ===
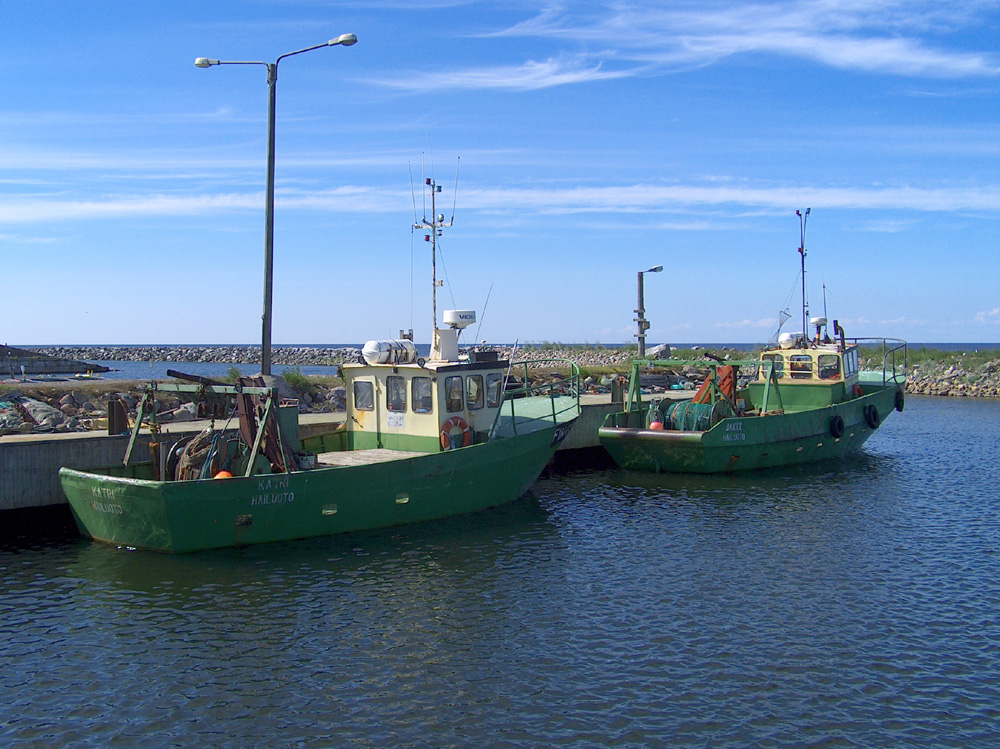
Fishing boats in Marjaniemi

- Järventakusta
- Hailuoto
- Koivukylä
- Marjaniemi
- Ojakylä
- Pöllä
- Ulkokarvo
- Vaski

== Climate ==
Hailuoto has a subarctic climate (Dfc). The climate is slightly milder than Oulu's due to influence from the Bothnian Bay.

Climate data for Hailuoto Keskikylä (1991–2020 normals, extremes 1959- present)
Month	Jan	Feb	Mar	Apr	May	Jun	Jul	Aug	Sep	Oct	Nov	Dec	Year
Record high °C (°F)	6.5 (43.7)	6.0 (42.8)	11.3 (52.3)	19.4 (66.9)	28.5 (83.3)	30.7 (87.3)	32.8 (91.0)	30.9 (87.6)	24.1 (75.4)	16.5 (61.7)	11.0 (51.8)	6.8 (44.2)	32.8 (91.0)
Mean maximum °C (°F)	2.9 (37.2)	3.0 (37.4)	5.6 (42.1)	13.1 (55.6)	21.4 (70.5)	24.7 (76.5)	26.3 (79.3)	24.9 (76.8)	19.1 (66.4)	12.0 (53.6)	7.1 (44.8)	4.3 (39.7)	27.4 (81.3)
Mean daily maximum °C (°F)	−4.3 (24.3)	−4.8 (23.4)	−0.8 (30.6)	4.9 (40.8)	11.8 (53.2)	17.1 (62.8)	20.3 (68.5)	18.4 (65.1)	12.9 (55.2)	6.1 (43.0)	1.3 (34.3)	−1.9 (28.6)	6.8 (44.2)
Daily mean °C (°F)	−7.6 (18.3)	−8.2 (17.2)	−4.5 (23.9)	1.0 (33.8)	7.2 (45.0)	12.8 (55.0)	16.1 (61.0)	14.3 (57.7)	9.5 (49.1)	3.7 (38.7)	−0.8 (30.6)	−4.5 (23.9)	3.3 (37.9)
Mean daily minimum °C (°F)	−11.4 (11.5)	−12.2 (10.0)	−8.5 (16.7)	−2.9 (26.8)	2.3 (36.1)	8.0 (46.4)	11.2 (52.2)	9.7 (49.5)	5.6 (42.1)	0.8 (33.4)	−3.4 (25.9)	−7.8 (18.0)	−0.7 (30.7)
Mean minimum °C (°F)	−26.2 (−15.2)	−26.1 (−15.0)	−21.3 (−6.3)	−12.0 (10.4)	−4.1 (24.6)	0.3 (32.5)	4.4 (39.9)	1.6 (34.9)	−2.8 (27.0)	−8.8 (16.2)	−14.1 (6.6)	−21.2 (−6.2)	−28.8 (−19.8)
Record low °C (°F)	−37.3 (−35.1)	−40.8 (−41.4)	−31.1 (−24.0)	−23.0 (−9.4)	−10.5 (13.1)	−3.3 (26.1)	0.8 (33.4)	−2.6 (27.3)	−7.8 (18.0)	−19.6 (−3.3)	−31.3 (−24.3)	−36.8 (−34.2)	−40.8 (−41.4)
Average precipitation mm (inches)	37 (1.5)	31 (1.2)	30 (1.2)	27 (1.1)	39 (1.5)	45 (1.8)	61 (2.4)	56 (2.2)	53 (2.1)	53 (2.1)	50 (2.0)	42 (1.7)	523 (20.6)
Average precipitation days	10	8	8	6	7	8	9	9	8	10	11	11	105
Source 1: FMI climatological normals for Finland 1991–2020
Source 2: Record highs and lows 1959- present

== Services ==
In the center village of Hailuoto there is a comprehensive school, two grocery stores (K-Market and Sale), a bank (Osuuspankki), a barber shop and a filling station (SEO).

The Arctic Light House Hotel for tourists is located right next to the Marjaniemi Lighthouse.

== Religion ==
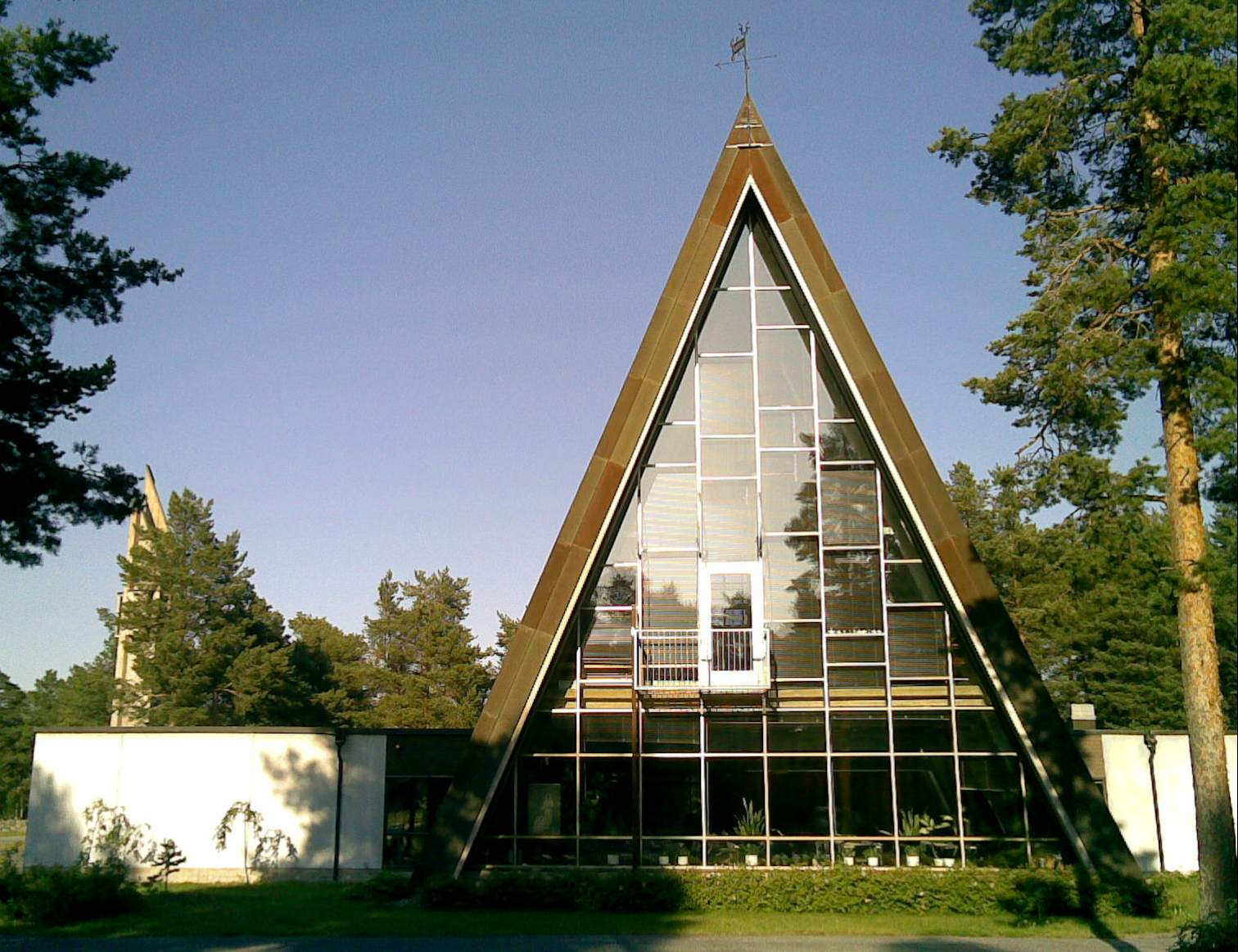
Hailuoto Church, built in 1972

According to the 2018 regional division, the only parishes in the municipality are the Hailuoto Parish of the Finnish Evangelical Lutheran Church and the Oulu Orthodox Parish of the Finnish Orthodox Church. Of the revival movements within the church, Conservative Laestadianism operates in the locality, which has the Hailuoto Peace Association (Hailuodon Rauhanyhdistys).

== Culture ==
The entire island of Hailuoto is classified as one of Finland's nationally significant built cultural environments. The unique landscape and natural conditions have made Hailuoto, the largest island in the Bay of Bothnia, one of Finland's national landscapes.

=== Festival ===
Since 2011, highly acclaimed Finnish indie music festival Bättre Folk has been organized in Marjaniemi.

=== Food ===
In the 1980s, fish potatoes made from European whitefish were named traditional food of the Hailuoto parish.

== Transportation ==
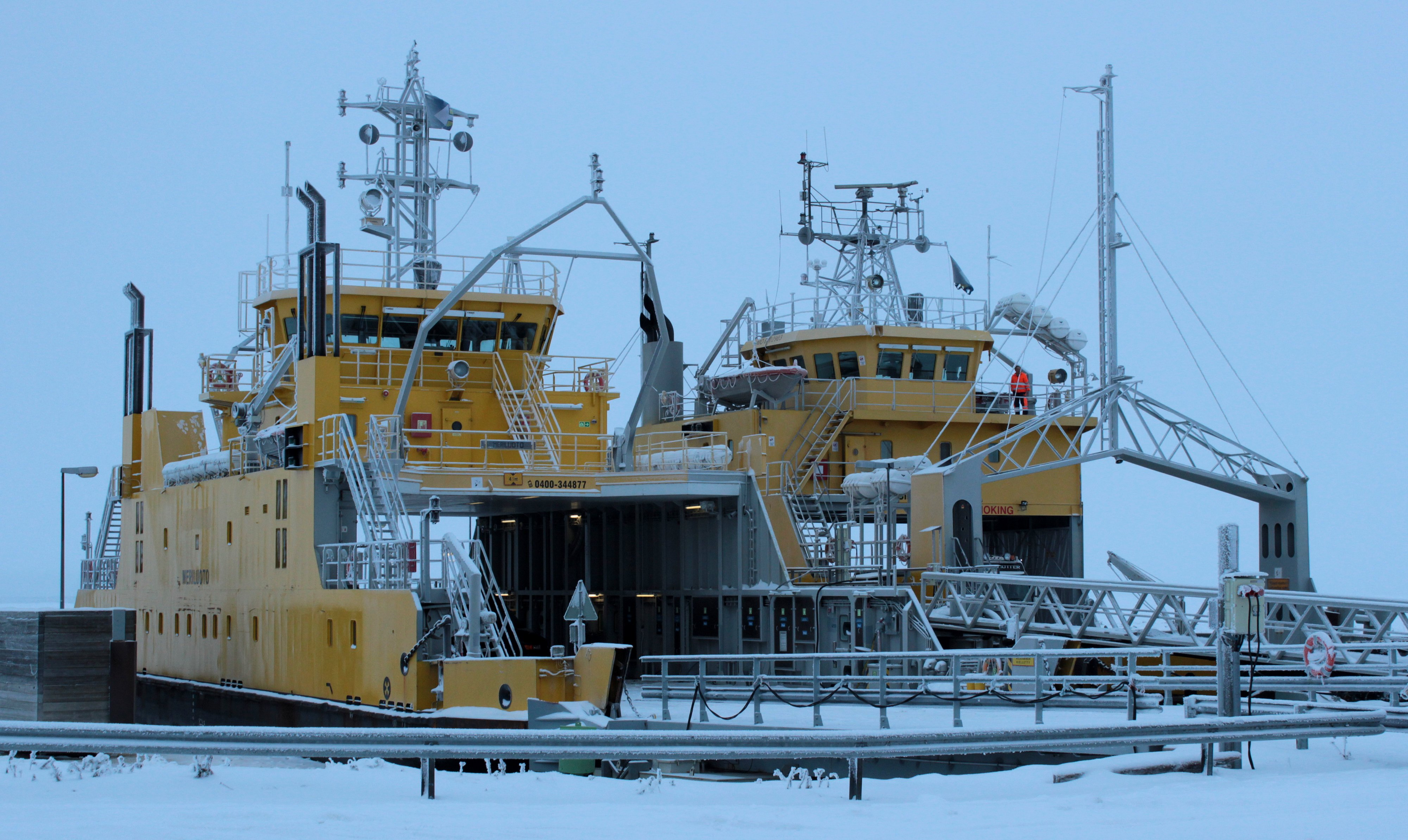
The ferries Meriluoto and Merisilta

The main road on the island is the regional road 816, which continues to the mainland towards the Kempele municipality via a causeway. Hailuoto also has a small airfield, Hailuoto Airfield, about 6 kilometres (4 mi) south of central village.

A 8.4 km fixed link to connect Hailuoto to the mainland, consisting of a causeway with two 750 m bridges, was approved in 2015. The project was briefly halted due to environmental litigation, which was eventually denied in 2023.

Actual construction work began in 2024. The causeway opened on 29 June 2026.

Until the fixed link opened, a ferry operated regularly between Hailuoto and Oulu's suburb of Oulunsalo. In winter an official ice road, approximately 10 kilometres (6.2 mi) long, connected the island to the mainland.

== Notable people ==
- Henry Askeli (1886–1962), Finnish American journalist and labor activist
- Yrjö Karilas (1891–1982), writer

== See also ==
- Hiidenniemi beacon tower
