= Russian Memorial, Lewes =

Russian Memorial
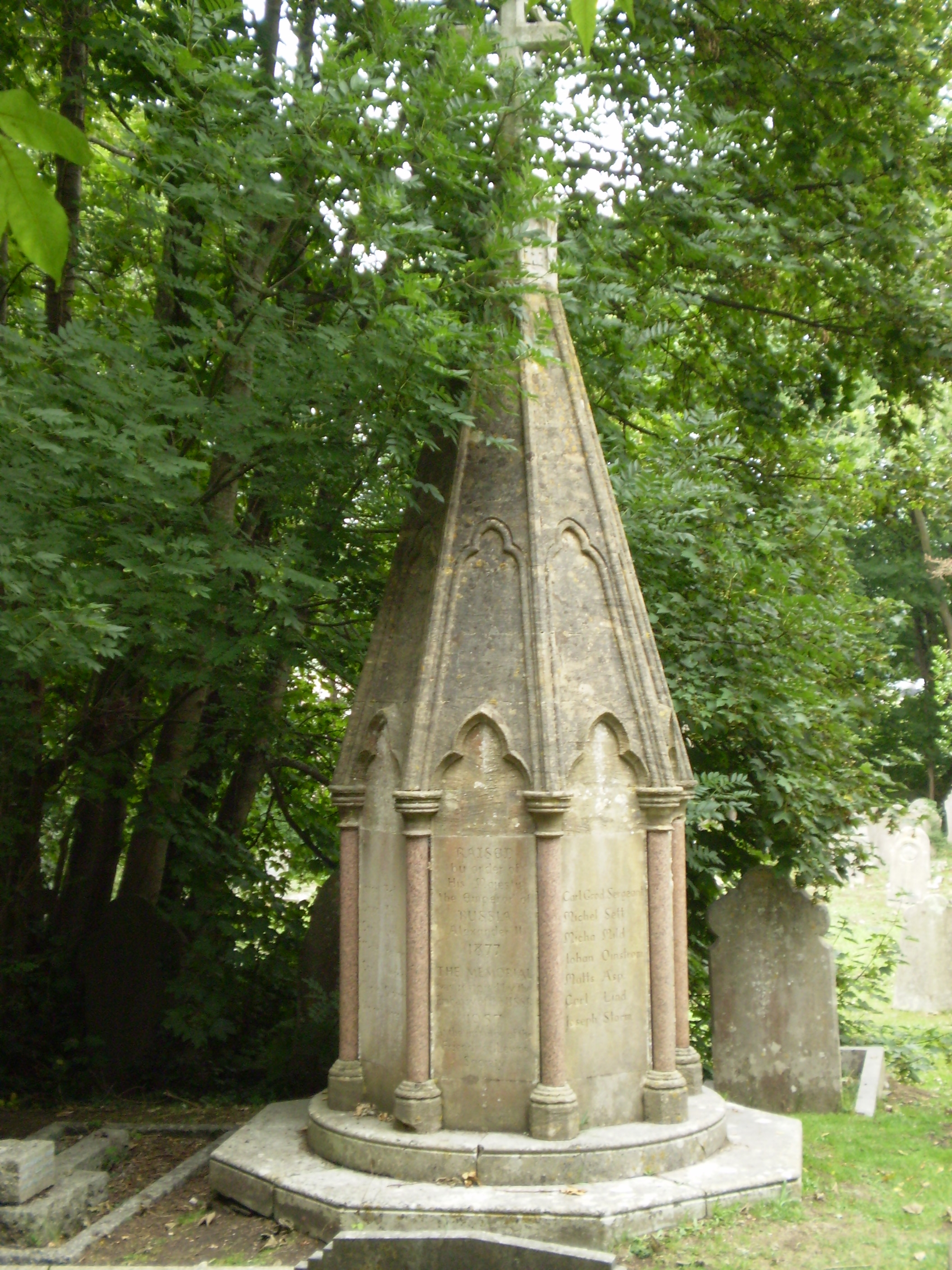
- The Russian Memorial, showing the north-west, west, and south-west panels

- The memorial shown within East Sussex
- 50.8764°N 0.0102°E
- Location: St John sub Castro churchyard, Abinger Place, Lewes, East Sussex, England

History
- Built: 1877
- Built for: Alexander II of Russia

Site notes
- Architect: Philip Currey
- Architectural style: Neo-Gothic

Listed Building – Grade II
- Official name: Russian Memorial in the Churchyard of St John sub Castro
- Designated: 29 October 1985
- Reference no.: 1043887

The Russian Memorial is an obelisk in the churchyard of St John sub Castro in Lewes, the county town of East Sussex, England (grid reference TQ4152210471). It was erected in 1877 at the behest of Alexander II, Emperor of Russia, in memory of 28 Finnish soldiers of the Russian Army of the Crimean War who died while prisoners of war in Lewes between 1854 and 1856. It has been designated by English Heritage as a Grade II listed building.

== Background ==
What became known as the Crimean War was declared in March 1854. In June, concerned at the possible threat posed to Britain by the Russian Baltic Fleet, the Royal Navy attacked the fortress of Bomarsund, in Åland off the coast of Finland during the Åland War. That attack was repulsed, but a further attack by British and French forces in August proved successful. The fortress was destroyed and prisoners taken to Britain and France. Some 340 members of the Fusilier Grenadiers were taken to Lewes, in Sussex. The officers were Russian, but the men were mostly Finns – the Grand Duchy of Finland was part of the Russian Empire at the time and many of the defenders of Bomarsund had been Finnish conscripts.

The officers, having given their parole, were housed with local families and integrated themselves into local society. After "several of the leading gentlemen of the county [had] been introduced to the officers, and others left their cards", the officers went riding, appearing "delighted with the salubrity of the air", were invited to shoot on a local estate, succeeding in "bagging a large quantity of game", and attended a charity concert in Brighton. Such freedom of movement left them "frequently subjected to annoyance, insult, and even personal violence from the low characters who loiter in the streets", though the local magistrates dealt severely with such offences.

The men were confined in the old County Gaol, which had been given a new lease of life as a naval prison. A workshop was set up so that they could produce wooden toys for sale to the public to earn themselves pocket money. By October 1854, it was reported that:

a large demand for these articles has sprung up, from 6d. upwards being the price paid for each article bought by the numerous customers, and with this price the men appear exceedingly well pleased. ... The toyshop-keepers at Brighton have taken the hint, and most of the shops of that description have "Russian toys" ticketted in their windows.

The prison became quite a tourist attraction, admitting as many as 500 visitors in a day, and some days the sale of toys brought in as much as £40 (£3,700 at today's prices). The receipts were used to purchase additional food and luxuries: according to the Times, "it has been said that they are too well fed", and "scarcely a prisoner is without a watch, and many of the time-pieces are of gold". The generous treatment afforded to the Finnish prisoners was not universally popular: a letter to the Times spoke of general disgust that:

... when we see bereaved widows and fatherless orphans of our butchered soldiers starving while points of military etiquette are being discussed, we are informed that the Russian prisoners at Lewes have had their wives brought over to live with them, are selling their toys as fast as they can make them at high prices, and to crown all, have received large sums of money from various noblemen and gentlemen to provide themselves with luxuries!

After a group of men had refused to go out for exercise unless accompanied by three of their number in solitary confinement for misconduct, and their protest had escalated to armed rebellion, 25 of the ringleaders were removed to a prison ship at Sheerness, and the remainder locked in their own cells at night. By September 1855, 15 prisoners had died of disease – tuberculosis was prevalent. The death-toll would rise to 28 by the end of their incarceration, and the dead were buried in the nearby churchyard of St John sub Castro.

The prisoners' popularity in Lewes remained undimmed. When peace was concluded between Britain and Russia in 1856, and the time came for their return home, the parting "is said to have been genuinely sorrowful". The commanding officer publicly thanked the people of Lewes and wrote to the Senior Constable on behalf of his fellow officers, expressing gratitude for having "enjoyed the hospitality of many, and urbane treatment from all" and spoke of their pleasure at the prospect of returning home being "much modified by the regret we feel in thus bidding farewell to those who have shown so much kindness". After a civic farewell, the townsfolk lined the streets to watch them leave.

== Memorial ==
At the behest of Tsar Alexander II of Russia, a monument was commissioned to commemorate those 28 Finnish prisoners of war who died during their captivity. Designed by Philip Currey and made by local mason John Strong in a neo-Gothic style, it stands in the churchyard of St John sub Castro, near the site of the naval prison, on the spot where the deceased were buried. The Times reported that on 1 May 1877, the work was inspected and approved by General Alexander Gorloff, the Russian military attaché. Set on a round plinth above an octagonal stone base, the monument takes the form of an octagonal drum with cusped arches separated by granite shafts, above which the stonework tapers in the form of a spire, topped by an octagonal tabernacle and a cross. The whole is 17 feet (5.2 m) in height.

Each arch surrounds an inscribed panel. That on the east side reads "Sacred to the Memory of the Russian Soldiers who died Prisoners of War in Lewes in the years 1854 1855 1856", and on the west reads "Raised by Order of His Majesty the Emperor of Russia Alexander II 1877", and now carries an addition to show that the Soviet Embassy restored the memorial in 1957. The north panel reproduces the wording from the "simple Head Stone" placed over the original burial by "their Surviving Comrades": "Erected by the Finlanders Russian Prisoners of War as a Memorial of their Countrymen and fellow Prisoners who died During their Captivity in Lewes War Prison". That on the south side has four lines of verse, also transcribed from the first memorial, and the intervening panels are inscribed with the names of the 28 deceased.

The memorial was listed at Grade II by English Heritage on 29 October 1985. This status is given to "nationally important buildings of special interest". As of February 2001, it was one of 1,162 Grade II listed buildings, and 1,250 listed buildings of all grades, in the district of Lewes.

== List of names ==
Abraham Lindfors, Erik Kivi, Matts Mort, Adolf Granat, Matts Lilja, Carl Boll, John Kive; Johan Rof, David Kihl, Carl Udd, Matts Hellman, Carl Wec(?h/k)tars, Michel Gronroos, Victor Wass; Johan Mail, Gustaf (?)Husar, Johan Hellen, Gustaf Kyro, Victor Walander, Joel (?Inlo), Matts Lindstrom; Carl Grod Sergeant, Michel Sett, Micha Mild, Johan Oinstrom, Matts Asp, Carl Lind, Joseph Storm.

== Legacy ==
A popular Finnish folk-song, Oolannin sota (Crimean War), evolved from the earlier Ålandin sota laulu (Åland war song) which tells of the prisoners' capture and imprisonment in Lewes and is thought to have been written by one of the Lewes prisoners during his captivity. Stephen Plaice used the story as the inspiration for the libretto of an opera, The Finnish Prisoner, set to music by Orlando Gough and incorporating the song Oolannin sota. The opera received its world premiere in Lewes in 2007 under the direction of Susannah Waters with a cast of professional singers including members of the Finnish National Opera, a locally recruited amateur chorus, and a chorus of children. The production was the subject of a Finnish television programme which included material related to the memorial.

== See also ==
- Lewes War Memorial
