= Church of St John sub Castro, Lewes =

Church in East Sussex, England

St John sub Castro
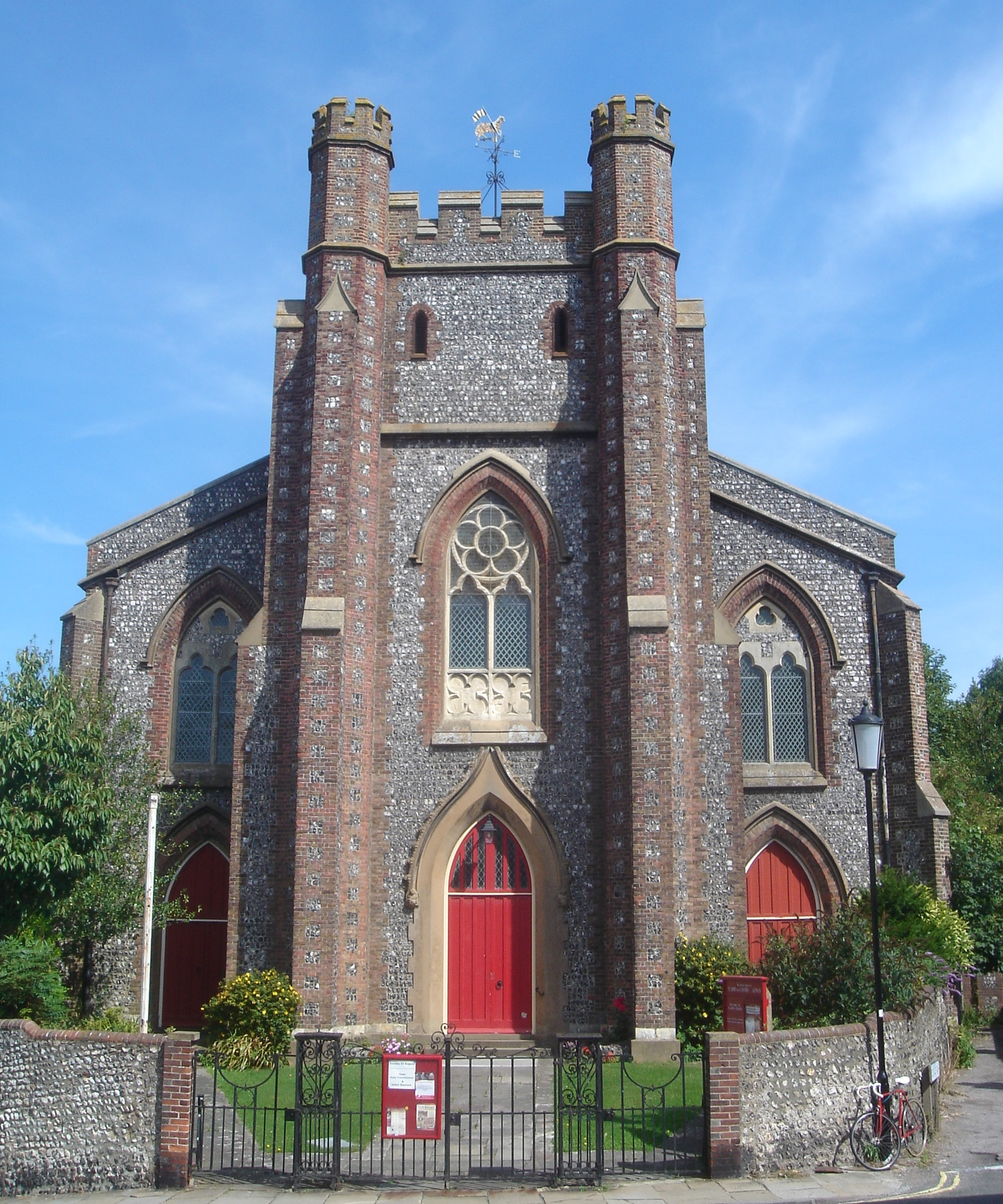
- The Church of St John sub Castro from the south
- St John sub Castro
- 50.8760°N 0.0094°E
- OS grid reference: TQ 4146 1040
- Location: Abinger Place, Lewes, East Sussex BN7 2QA
- Country: England
- Denomination: Church of England

History
- Status: Parish church
- Dedication: John the Baptist
- Consecrated: 3 June 1840

Architecture
- Functional status: Active
- Heritage designation: Grade II
- Designated: 16 March 1970
- Architect: George Cheesman
- Architectural type: Church
- Completed: 1839
- Construction cost: £3,300

Specifications
- Materials: Flint, red brick

Administration
- Diocese: Chichester
- Archdeaconry: Lewes & Hastings
- Deanery: Lewes & Seaford
- Parish: St John sub Castro

Clergy
- Rector: Rev. Anita Colpus

The Church of St John sub Castro is an Anglican church in Lewes, the county town of East Sussex, England (grid reference TQ 414 104). It was built in 1839 on the site of an 11th-century Saxon church, and has been designated by English Heritage as a Grade II listed building. In the churchyard is a memorial to Finnish prisoners from the Crimean War who died while confined in Lewes Naval Prison; the memorial is also listed Grade II. The church continues to be active as a parish church in the diocese of Chichester.

== History ==
In the early 11th century, a church was built on the site of a Roman fort erected to guard a crossing over the Ouse, below which the river was navigable. The site was in the north-west corner of the walled town, on "the brink of an abrupt cliff of chalk", and contained two conical mounds, one of which was later found to contain remains of human burials. The church came into the possession of the Cluniac Priory of St Pancras in 1121, and the earliest known reference to its relation to Lewes Castle (Latin: sub castro), presumably to distinguish it from the priory chapel at Southover, also dedicated to St John the Baptist, dates from 1190. William Camden's Britannia of 1586 reported the building "all desolate and beset with briers and brambles". Around that time the chancel was demolished, and a major restoration in 1635 left the church comprising just nave and tower. In the early 19th century, there was significant housing development in the St John's area of the town. The church had only 260 seats, totally inadequate for a parish whose population had trebled over a 30-year period to more than 2,300 and continued to grow. Concluding that it was impractical to extend the old church, the rector, Peter Guerin Crofts the Younger, had it demolished and a new one built on the site. The 1851 religious census of Sussex reported the population of the parish at 2,485, and the average attendance at evening service at 800.

== Architecture ==
=== Structure ===
The new church was designed by George Cheesman in the Early English style, to include a rectangular aisled nave with no arcading, a short chancel, and a short embattled tower with castellated octagonal turrets, and constructed in knapped flint with red brick dressings. An apse was a later addition. Because of the limitations of the site, it was built on a north–south rather than the usual east–west orientation, and lies to the south of the original building. It has large lancet windows with what Nikolaus Pevsner describes as "ignorant" tracery, and (again according to Pevsner) a "good, solid barn roof with tie-beams". The tower, placed centrally at the ceremonial west end of the church, projects forward of the front wall, and contains three 18th-century bells by John Waylett, one of which was re-cast in 1886.

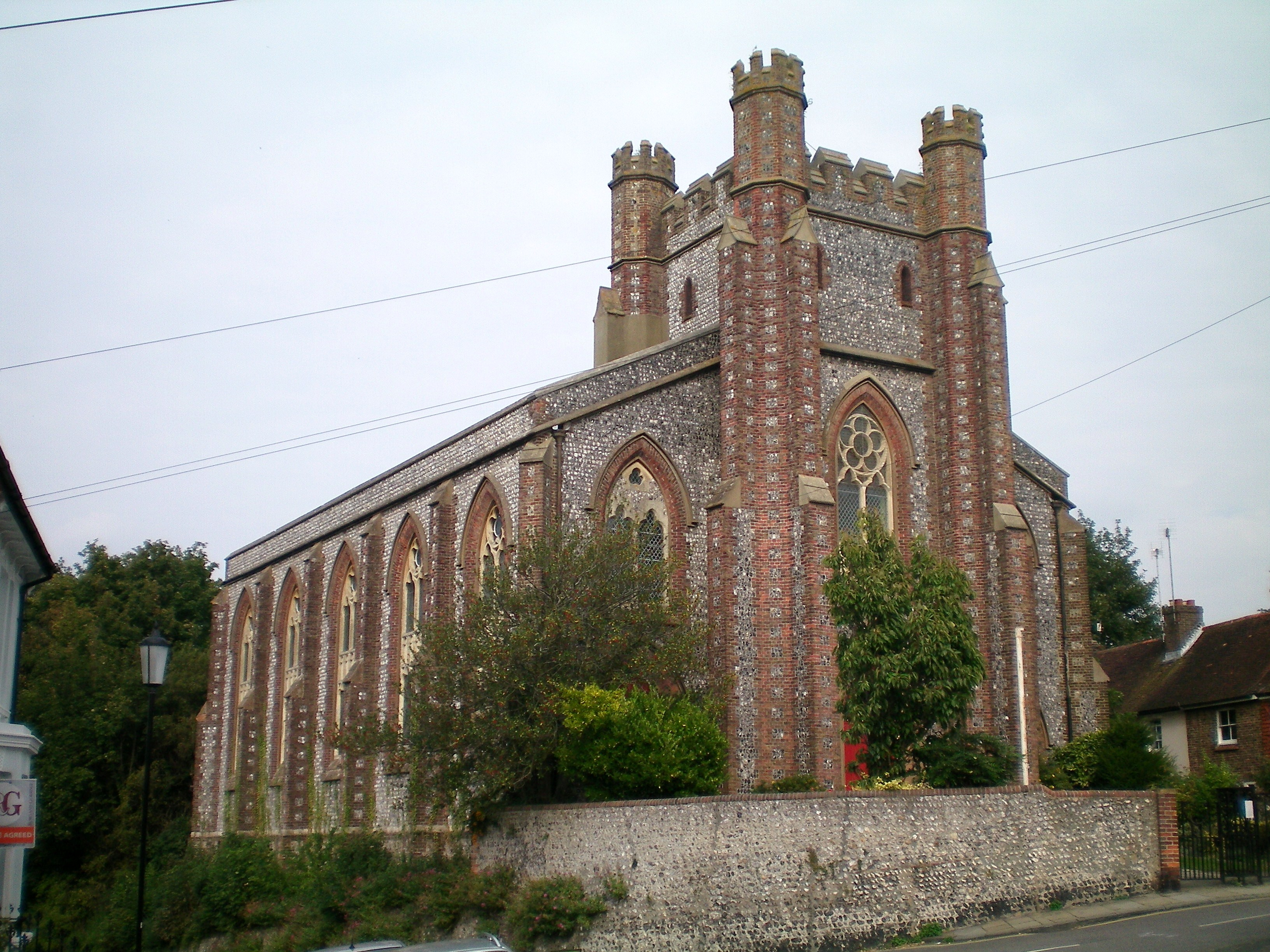
St John sub Castro from the south-west, 2009

Though the local newspaper found the new construction "convenient and well-arranged", others were less impressed. Mark Antony Lower, founder of the Sussex Archaeological Society, called it a "modern brick structure, which we cannot commend, as it is a kind of hybrid between a castle and a barn", while the 1868 edition of Murray's Handbook for Travellers in Kent and Sussex was blunter, calling it "modern, and ugly".

=== Furniture and fittings ===
Internally, cast iron posts support galleries with painted panelled fronts which extend for the full length of the nave on each side. The ceiling is barrel-shaped, with pine trusses, and is painted orange and brown. The apse has stained glass windows designed by Henry Holiday and made by James Powell and Sons, and windows in the aisles include three produced by Savell in the latter part of the 19th century, and one by Walter Tower of Kempe & Co., dated 1910, which honours Prebendary Arthur Perfect.

The two-manual organ, built by Bishop in 1882 and rebuilt by Morgan & Smith of Brighton in 1927, stands in a chamber in the apse. When first opened, worshippers sat in box pews. Unusually for the time, more than half the seats in the church were free, i.e. no pew rents were charged, and many such free seats were in central positions in the nave. The box pews have since been replaced by open benches.

There are two fonts: a 15th-century octagonal bowl with arcading on three sides of the stem, in "battered" condition, and a quatrefoil-shaped bowl supported by marble shafts dating from the later 19th century. Above the main door is a large painting of Jesus blessing the children, which was painted in the workshop of Frans Floris in the 16th century, and above that are the royal coat of arms of George IV in iron. The parish registers exist from 1602.

== External features ==
Remnants of the old church were incorporated in the new. The arch of the original Saxon south door was reset in the north wall, surrounding a 13th-century grave-slab. The jambs and arch are undecorated and unmoulded, but outside these are three half-shafts and half-rolls, above which are plain slabs as capitals. Above the door is a stone bearing the date 1635, when the old church was restored, and the names of the two then churchwardens.

=== Magnus inscription ===
The "Magnus inscription", a Latin inscription on 15 voussoirs arranged as a semi-circular arch, rescued by a local antiquarian from the rubble when the chancel of the old church was demolished in 1587 and erected in the wall of the nave in 1635, was reset, also surrounding a grave-slab, in the east exterior wall of the new church. The original stones, dating from around 1200, are in a medieval Lombardic script, but several have been re-carved. The inscription reads "Clauditur hic miles Danorum regia proles Mangnus nomen ei mangne nota progeniei; deponens mangnum se moribus induit agnum, prepete pro vita fit parvulus anachorita", which translates as "There enters this cell a warrior of Denmark's royal race; Magnus his name, mark of mighty lineage. Casting off his Mightiness he takes the Lamb's mildness, and to gain everlasting life becomes a lowly anchorite". The verse plays on the anchorite's name being the same as the Latin word for "great" or "mighty", magnus, here spelt mangnus.

Tradition has it that Magnus was a Danish general who led a war-party into the region. After his men were killed and he himself taken prisoner, he "was so kindly treated that he became a convert to Christianity, or at least, if before a Christian, he then embraced the life of an anchorite". A theory long since discounted suggested he should be identified with Magnus, the son of King Harold II, who fled to Ireland after the Norman Conquest and later took part in incursions against England.

=== Churchyard ===
The flint walls of the churchyard were listed Grade II in 1970. On the north and west sides they are believed to follow the line of the former town walls, the churchyard being in the north-west corner of the walled part of the town, and may contain material from those walls. In the churchyard are several carved gravestones, including that of one Mark Sharp, carpenter, who made the head- and footstones himself, depicting a set of carpenter's tools. The paved floor of the old chancel covers the burial vault of the Crofts family.

=== Russian Memorial ===
In the churchyard is an obelisk erected in 1877 at the behest of Tsar Alexander II of Russia as a memorial to 28 Finnish soldiers of the Imperial Russian army, taken prisoner at the Baltic fortress of Bomarsund during the Crimean War, who died of disease in Lewes Naval Prison (no longer standing). Designed by Philip Currey and made by local mason John Strong in a neo-Gothic style, it takes the form of an octagonal drum with marble ribs tapering to a spire, topped with a tabernacle and a cross. It bears the names of the 28 and the inscriptions "Sacred to the Memory of the Russian Soldiers who died Prisoners of War in Lewes in the years 1854 1855 1856", and "Raised by Order of His Majesty the Emperor of Russia Alexander II 1877", with an addition to show that the Soviet Embassy restored the memorial in 1957. It is listed Grade II. The prisoners' story was the inspiration for the libretto of Orlando Gough's opera The Finnish Prisoner, which received its world premiere in 2007.

== Current activities ==
St John sub Castro continues to be active as an Anglican parish church in the diocese of Chichester, the archdeaconry of Brighton and Lewes and the deanery of Lewes and Seaford. It holds a modern, family-friendly morning service each Sunday, and services of Holy Communion and evening prayer once a month. It has hosted the town's annual Remembrance Sunday services. Musical concerts are held in the church.

The church was listed at Grade II by English Heritage on 16 March 1970. This status is given to buildings which are "nationally important and of special interest". As of February 2001, it was one of 1,162 Grade II listed buildings, and 1,250 listed buildings of all grades, in the district of Lewes.

== See also ==
- List of places of worship in Lewes District
