= Susannah Waters =

British writer and director

- Born: Maidstone, Kent, England, UK
- Education: Bennington College
- Alma mater: Guildhall School of Music and Drama
- Occupations: Singer, writer and director
- Years active: 1990–present
- Spouse: Federay Holmes
- Relatives: Mark Rylance (brother)

Susannah Waters is a British writer and director. Born in Kent, England, she attended both Bennington College in America and the Guildhall School of Music, in London, as well as the National Opera Studio.

Actor Mark Rylance is one of her brothers. For twelve years, she worked as an opera singer, performing principal roles in many of the world's leading opera houses, including the Royal Opera House, Glyndebourne Festival Opera, Welsh National Opera, Scottish Opera, New York City Opera, Santa Fe Opera Festival, LA Opera, Seattle Opera, Théâtre du Châtelet, and Royal Swedish Opera.

In 2002, she left singing to become a writer and stage director. Her first novel, Long Gone Anybody, was published by Black Swan in 2004, and short-listed for the Pendleton May Award and Geoffrey Faber Award. Her second novel, Cold Comfort, published by Black Swan in 2006, featured on Radio 4’s Today programme as one of the first fictional novels dealing with the effects of climate change. She is currently completing her third. She was an Associate Tutor in Creative Writing at the University of Sussex, and has tutored for the Arvon Foundation as well as mentoring for The Literary Consultancy.

Her first music theatre piece, the regina monologues, was commissioned by the Covent Garden Festival in 2001, and starred, in respective productions, Penelope Keith, Janet Suzman and Susannah York. Other commissions for theatre have included The One I Love, a music theatre piece on conscientious objection to war for New Kent Opera, It’s Your Funeral, Baby, for Brighton-based company Theatre and Beyond, and Red All Over, a site-specific play performed in six rooms of a hotel, commissioned by the Lewes Live Literature Festival. Her most recent play, Eat This, was produced in a disused brewery and revived in the autumn of 2011 with the addition of an accompanying piece, Drink That.

In 2004, she founded her own production company, The Paddock, and as the Artistic Director, devised and produced theatre, dance and opera projects, including the children’s theatre piece, Elsie Piddock Skips in Her Sleep, a new touring production of Daisy Ashford’s The Young Visiters, a one-day outdoor dance festival, Something to Dance About, involving seven newly commissioned dances, and The Shoe Nail Dance, a High Street dance involving 200 people. In 2007, she commissioned and directed The Finnish Prisoner, a new opera from the composer Orlando Gough and librettist Stephen Plaice. The Finnish Prisoner had its world première in a warehouse in Lewes in a co-production with Finnish National Opera and was nominated for a Royal Philharmonic Society award in three categories.

In 2005 and 2007, Waters worked with The Samling Foundation leading a large-scale education project at the Sage Gateshead Music Centre on Mozart’s Così fan tutte (2005) and Don Giovanni (2007), directed by Sir Thomas Allen and culminating in the creation and performance of youth versions of the two operas. In 2013, Waters directed a new main stage community opera for Glyndebourne Festival Opera, co-devised with the composer Orlando Gough, librettist Stephen Plaice, and designer Es Devlin. In November 2013, she directed Chabrier’s L’Etoile for New Sussex Opera, and in May 2014 she directed a new production of Harrison Birtwistle’s Down by the Greenwood Side for the Brighton Festival.
