= The Finnish Prisoner =

British opera

- Opera by Orlando Gough
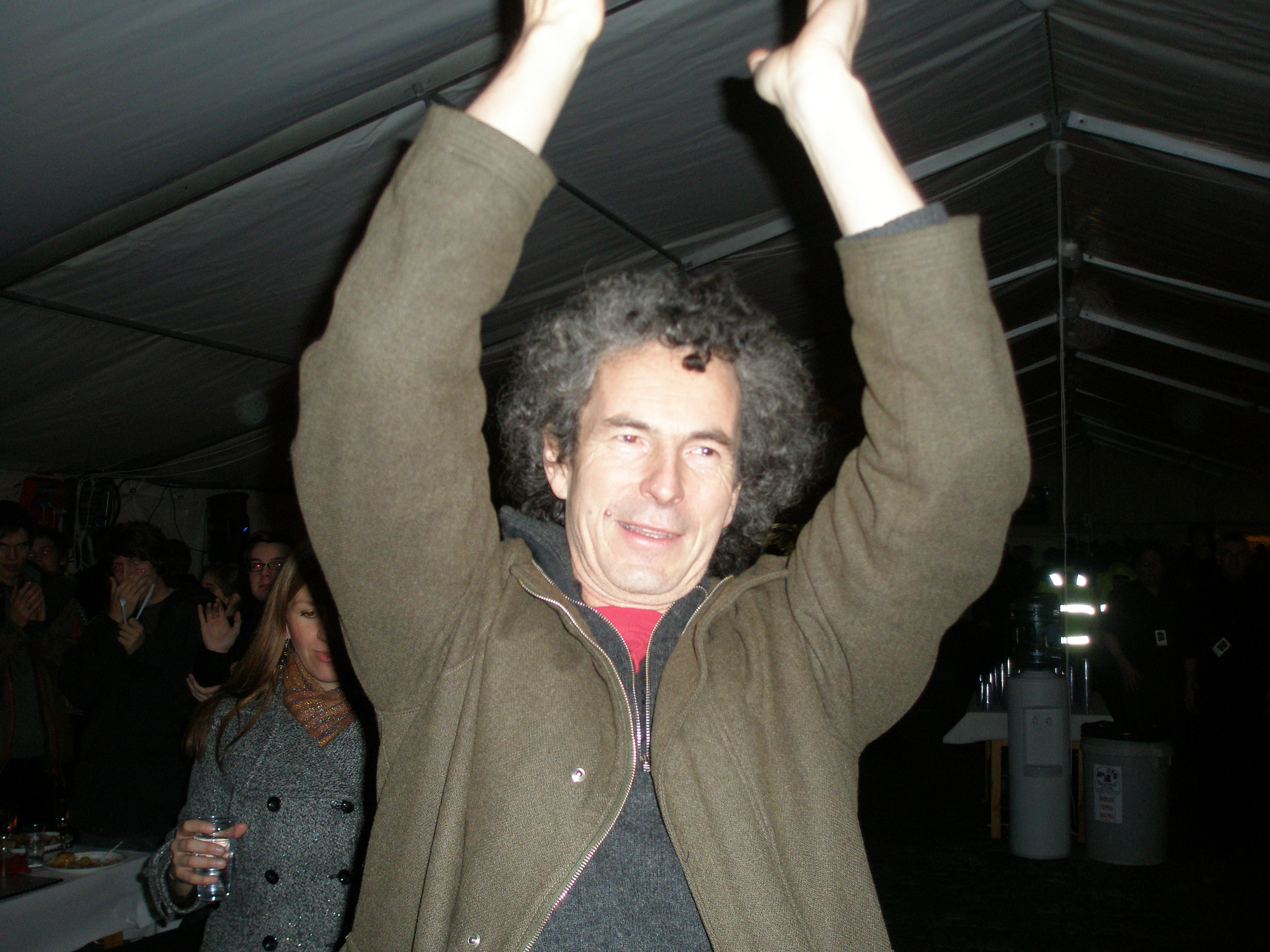
- The composer in 2008
- Librettist: Stephen Plaice
- Language: English
- Premiere: 11 July 2007; Lewes

The Finnish Prisoner is an opera by Orlando Gough set to an English-language libretto written by Stephen Plaice who based it on the true story of Finnish prisoners of war incarcerated in England during the Åland War, part of the Crimean War.

== Background ==
When the Russian fortress of Bomarsund, in Åland in the eastern Baltic off the coast of Finland, was destroyed during the Åland War, many hundreds of prisoners were taken, some 340 of whom were taken to Lewes, in Sussex, England. While the officers were Russian, the men were mostly Finnish conscripts – the Grand Duchy of Finland was part of the Russian Empire at the time. The officers were housed with local families, allowed complete freedom of movement, and integrated themselves into local society. The men, confined in the Naval Prison, were given facilities to produce wooden toys for sale to the public. The prison, which was open to visitors, became a major tourist attraction, and both the toys and their makers were hugely popular with locals and tourists alike. When peace was concluded, and the time came for the prisoners to return home, the commanding officer addressed the townsfolk in gratitude for their hospitality.

While in captivity, 28 prisoners had died of disease, and in 1877 Tsar Alexander II of Russia arranged for a monument to be erected in their memory, which still stands in the churchyard of St John sub Castro, near the site of the Naval Prison. A popular Finnish folk-song, Oolannin sota (Crimean War), evolved from the earlier Ålandin sota laulu (Åland war song) which tells of their capture and imprisonment in Lewes and is thought to have been written by one of the Lewes prisoners during his internment.

== Production ==
Stephen Plaice, at the time writer-in-residence at the modern Lewes Prison, came across the story and used it as the basis for the libretto. The music was composed by Orlando Gough, scored for a four-piece "orchestra" of violin, accordion, bass clarinet and vibraphone, and for three choruses, including a chorus of children.

The opera received its world premiere in Lewes on 11 July 2007, in a venue very near the site of the Naval Prison, in front of a sell-out audience including Finland's ambassador to London. The production was previewed in The Guardian and covered by television channels from three countries as well as by local press and media. It was directed by Susannah Waters with a cast of professional singers including members of the Finnish National Opera and locally recruited amateur choruses. The highlight of the premiere was what Mark Pappenheim's review in Opera called the "hair-raisingly deep-toned rendition" of Oolannin sota by the Finnish singers, whose style Waters had described in rehearsal as "simple, open-throated singing free of operatic airs".

== Roles ==
Role	Voice type	Premiere cast, 11 July 2007 Conductor: John Harcorn
Cora Combe, 21st-century young woman	mezzo-soprano	Marcia Bellamy
Lily, Cora's great-grandmother	soprano	Joanna Songi
Matts Olander, Finnish prisoner	baritone	Jarmo Ojala
John Triptolemus, photographer	tenor	Stephen Chaundy
Prison warder/Traffic warden	baritone	Andrew Rupp
Finnish prisoners	tenor and bass	Members of the Finnish National Opera
Director		Susannah Waters
Designer		Num Stibbe
Lighting		Clare O'Donoghue

== Synopsis ==
Cora carries a picture of her great-grandmother as a young woman back to her car, which is parked on the spot where a cell of the Lewes Naval Prison once stood. She unlocks the car, an act which triggers the first manifestation of parallel realities specific to that site but 150 years apart: the apparition of Matts Olander, a Finnish soldier who once occupied that cell. The action switches between past and present: characters appear as people in their own time and as ghosts in the other. While Cora dates John, he ill-treats her because he cannot have the 19th-century Lily, a clergyman's daughter and Cora's great-grandmother; Lily in turn is in love with Matts. All are watched over by the benevolent authority figure of the prison warder/traffic warden. Pappenheim describes it as dealing with "the power of love and lust to reach out across the gulfs of language, race, time and space".
