= Deutscher Chor London =

London-based amateur mixed-voice choir

- Choir
- Also known as: German Choir of London
- Origin: London, UK
- Founded: 2009
- Founder: Barbara Höfling
- Genre: German classical
- Members: 50
- Music director: Barbara Höfling
- Website: Official website

The Deutscher Chor London (DCL), also known as the German Choir of London, is a London-based amateur mixed-voice choir with a core repertoire of German classical choral pieces and a special interest in contemporary works. The choir was founded in 2009 by its current musical director Barbara Höfling.

DCL gives around twelve performances each year and has released two CD recordings.

== About ==
DCL was founded in 2009 by singer and conductor Barbara Höfling. The initial membership was drawn largely from amateur singers associated with the Deutsche Evangelische Christuskirche in Knightsbridge, London. It has since grown to be the largest German choir in the UK.

Currently, the choir comprises around fifty active members of various nationalities. It continues to rehearse each week at the Christuskirche in Knightsbridge.

== Repertoire ==
=== Classical ===
DCL's core repertoire is drawn from the German choral tradition of the seventeenth to late nineteenth centuries, in particular the works of Heinrich Schütz, Bach, Haydn, Brahms, Mendelssohn, Max Reger, Rheinberger and Bruckner.

The choir's repertoire extends to other works from the classical choral canon, including pieces by Vivaldi, Händel and Britten.

=== Contemporary ===
In addition to its core classical repertoire, DCL regularly performs new choral works. Its contemporary repertoire includes the following works commissioned for the choir itself:

- Ben See is part of our #CoronaCommissions project in 2020.
- Carol J. Jones is part of our #CoronaCommissions project in 2020.
- Jenni Watson's take on our #CoronaCommissions project in 2020 featured not only us but the Freiburg Saxophone Akademie as well.
- Sarah Rimkus is part of our #CoronaCommissions project in 2020.
- Luke Styles is part of our #CoronaCommissions project in 2020.
- Ian Stephens' "Unruhige Träume" with lyrics from the opening of Kafka's "Die Verwandlung" (The Metamorphosis) is part of our #CoronaCommissions project in 2020
- Donna McKevitt's "Fear" with lyrics from a poem by Jan Noble is part of the #CoronaCommissions project in 2020.
- Michael Cryne's "Fear no more" with lyrics from William Shakespeare's Cymbeline is part of our #CoronaCommissions project in 2020.
- Danyal Dhondy's "An die Freude" a take on the well-known piece by Ludwig van Beethoven with lyrics by Friedrich Schiller for our concert "A European Celebration" in 2019.
- Orlando Gough's contemporary settings of war poetry by Siegfried Sassoon and May Cannan for the choir's upcoming “Selig sind die Friedfertigen” tour in 2018.
- Matt Gio's "The Answered Hymn", written to mark the 500th anniversary of the Reformation in 2017.
- Sarah Rimkus wrote a beautiful piece for us in 2016 for a performance at the Queens Gallery at Buckingham Palace.
- Scottish-inspired works by composers, commissioned to accompany the Buckingham Palace exhibition of Scottish art in 2016.
- six new Volkslied arrangements for the choir's 2015 CD "Der Mond ist aufgegangen", by Gareth Treseder "Sehnsucht nach dem Frühling", Danyal Dhondy, "Kein schöner Land in dieser Zeit" and the choir's musical director Barbara Höfling "Deutsch-Englische Vogelhochzeit" and "Am Brunnen vor dem Tore".
- Orlando Gough's commission for the 2012 Thames Festival XX Scharnhorst.

== Performances ==
The choir gives around twelve performances each year, encompassing: concert appearances in a range of venues; participation in church and cathedral services as a visiting choir; and charity engagements in London during the Christmas season.

=== Past performances ===
DCL's performance history features collaborations with such ensembles as: the Choir of King's College, Cambridge; the choir of St-Martin-in-the-Fields; the German Choir Paris; the UK Parliament choir; the West London Bach Consort; Petersham Voices; the Keld Ensemble; and the respective choirs of several Lutheran congregations in London.

Special events and projects with which the choir has been involved include:

- 2019: 10 year anniversary concert of GCL with Carl Orff Carmina Burana and 'A European Celebration' with 28 songs of the 28 countries belonging to the EU.
- 2018: "Selig sind die Friedfertigen" / "Blessed are the peacemakers" tour. A series of events to commemorate the centenary of the end of World War I, including performances in York Minster, Highgate Cemetery, Menin Gate in Ypres, Brussels Cathedral, St Paul's Cathedral and Coventry Cathedral.
- 2017: Reformation 500. A series of events marking the 500th anniversary of the Reformation, including services at Westminster Abbey and St Martin-in-the-Fields.
- 2016: Samsung World Choir series. A 24-day event in December 2016, featuring 24 choirs from 24 different countries each in hour-long performances in Piccadilly Circus.
- 2014: Hanover 2014. A series of events marking the 300th anniversary of the Hanoverian monarchy, including performances at The Queen's Gallery Buckingham Palace and the Christuskirche Knightsbridge.
- 2013: Bonhoeffer's Music. A celebration of the life of Dietrich Bonhoeffer, including performances at St Albans Cathedral and St James Piccadilly.
- 2012: Thames Festival. Performance of a new work by Orlando Gough in a concert aboard HMS Belfast.

==== Major performances ====
2009

- December – Christuskirche London: Christmas Concert
- September – Christuskirche London: Vivaldi, Gloria

2010

- December – Christuskirche London: Christmas Concert
- November – Coventry Cathedral and Westminster Cathedral: War Requiem with Parliament Choir and Southbank Symphonia,
- June – Concerts with the German Choir Paris Magnificat in Paris and London

2011

- December – Christuskirche London: Christmas Concert
- November – Christuskirche London: Bach Cantata
- June – Recordings for Christmas CD "Der Englische Gruss?"
- April – Christuskirche London: A cappella Concert

2012

- December – Royal Naval Chapel Greenwich: Weihnachtsoratorium
- September – Thames Festival: new pieces by Orlando Gough
- September – Christuskirche London: Bach Cantata
- July – Beethoven 9th Symphony with Forest Philharmonic Orchestra
- July – Christuskirche London: Bach Cantata
- June – Filming of "streets of London" arrangement by Peter Gritton for WDR German Television
- May – Christuskirche London: A cappella Concert
- March – Master class: Bach Cantata with Christoph Siebert
- February – St Matthew Passion with West-London Bach Consort
- January – Christuskirche London: Bach Cantata

2013

- December – St Mary Magdalene, Richmond: A German Christmas in collaboration with Petersham Voices
- November – St James's Church Paddington: Mendelssohn's Psalms 2, 42, 43
- May – St James Piccadilly: Polyphony of Life – Bonhoeffer's Music
- May – St Albans Cathedral: Polyphony of Life – Bonhoeffer's Music
- April – Westminster Abbey: Evensong
- April – Royal Naval Chapel Greenwich: Evensong

2014

- December – Hampton Court Palace: German and English Christmas carols
- November – St Lawrence Jewry: Romantic songs by Brahms – Liebesliederwalzer, Zigeunerliederwalzer, Neue Liebesliederwalzer, Quartette
- October – The Queen's Gallery, Buckingham Palace: An enchanting dialogue between art and music, celebrating the music of 18th century composers Croft, Händel and Haydn
- June – Christuskirche Knightsbridge: O worship the king – 1714–2014: 300 years of Hanover Succession Works by Haydn, Mendelssohn, CPE Bach, Gluck, Steffani and others

2015

- December – St Lawrence Jewry and St George's Bloomsbury: Bach Christmas Oratorio
- November – Hampton Court Palace: Christmas Carols
- October – Counting House, Cornhill: CD Release "Der Mond ist aufgegangen"

2016

- December – St Paul's Cathedral: Evensong with Mendelssohn Motets
- December – Piccadilly Circus: Christmas Carols
- October – The Queen's Gallery, Buckingham Palace: Specially commissioned pieces of Scottish-inspired music to accompany the exhibition 'Scottish Artists 1750–1900: From Caledonia to the Continent'.
- June – St James's Church Paddington: Bach Motets
- April – St Paul's Cathedral: Evensong with works by Brahms and Schütz

2017

- December – St Lawrence Jewry: Händel – Dixit Dominus & Vivaldi – Gloria
- October – Westminster Abbey: Service in celebration of 500 years of Reformation
- August – Notre-Dame Paris: Service for the WWI centenary including works by Reger, Bruckner, Mendelssohn, Rheinberger and Brahms
- June – St James's Church Paddington: works by Brahms, Rheinberger, Bruckner and others
- March – St Giles' Cripplegate: Bach – Johannespassion, with Keld Ensemble
- February – St Martin-in-the-Fields: Choral Evensong to mark the 500th Anniversary of the Reformation, together with the Choir of St Martin-in-the-Fields and singers from Lutheran congregations in London
- February – King's College Chapel, Cambridge: Bach Vesper, together with the King's College Choir under the direction of Stephen Cleobury

2018

- November – St Paul's Cathedral, Liverpool Cathedral and Lichfield Cathedral
- October – Coventry Cathedral and Winchester Cathedral
- September – Canterbury Cathedral
- August – Menin Gate, Ypres and Cathedral of St. Michael and St. Gudula, Brussels
- July – Highgate Cemetery London
- May – York Minster, Wakefield Cathedral, Bradford Cathedral
- February – Wells Cathedral

2019

- December: Evensong, St Paul's Cathedral, London
- December: Weihnachtsoratorium BWV 248, St Lawrence Jewry and St Giles-without-Cripplegate, London
- October: Carmina Burana, Round Chapel, London
- June: Stabat Mater, St Mary-at-Hill, London
- March: A European Celebration, St Columbas Hall, London
- January: Christuskirche, London on Holocaust Memorial Day

2021

- April: Virtuel Concert

== Discography ==
- Der englische Gruss, 2011 – a CD of Christmas music also featuring the Parliament Choir.
- Der Mond ist aufgegangen, 2015 – a CD of German and British folksongs also featuring several guest choirs. The tracks include new folksong arrangements from Gareth Treseder, Danyal Dhondy and choir musical director Barbara Hoefling.

== Television appearances ==
- BBC News at Six, June 2017
- ARD – Ein Brexit und drei Millionen Sorgen, 7/6/2017
- WDR – Wunderschön! Visit London – Shopping, Songs und Sightseeing, 29/4/2012. DCL sang “Streets of London” by Peter Gritton.
