= Skirmish of Halkokari =

1854 skirmish in the Åland War, Finland

- Part of the Åland War during the Crimean War
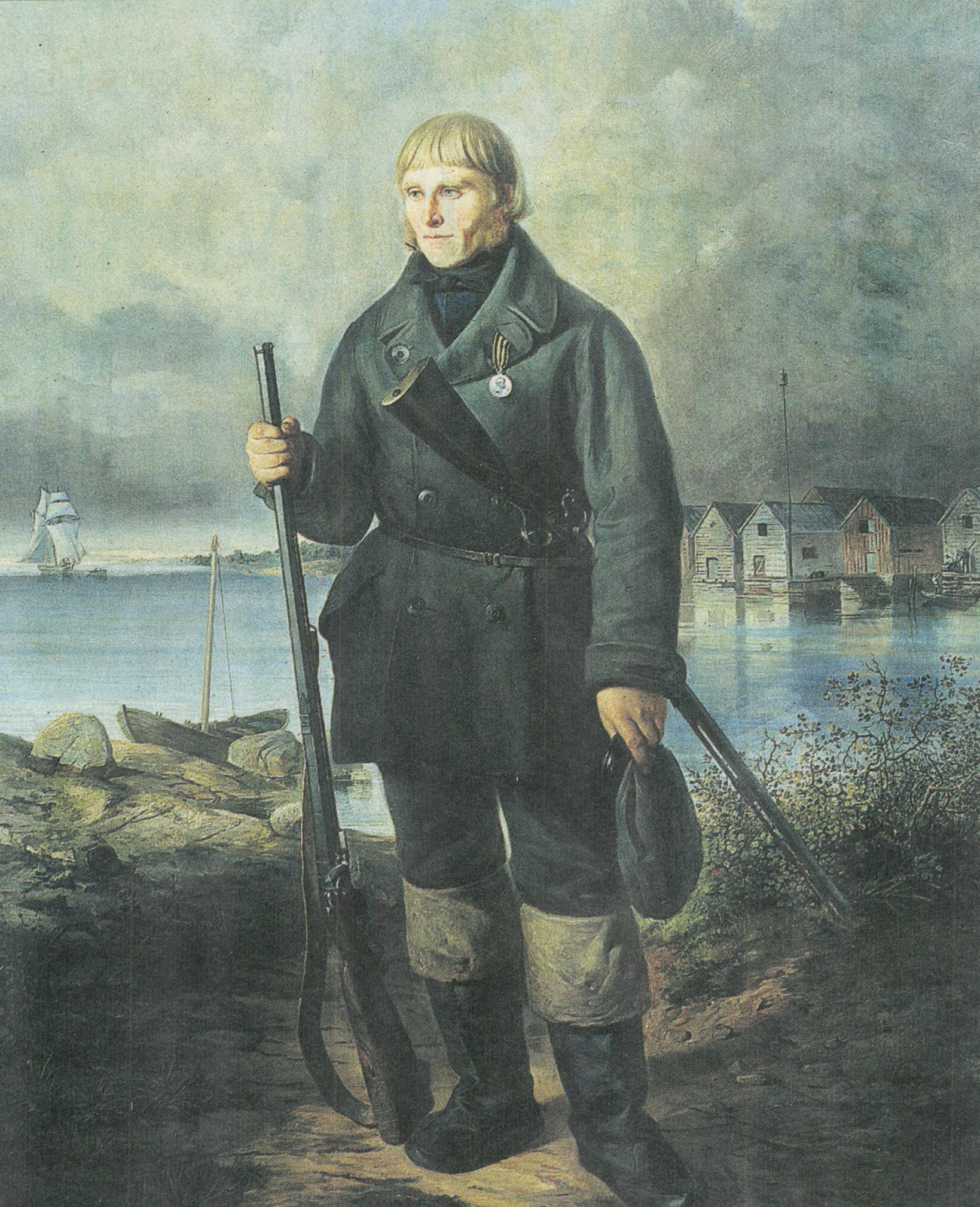
- Matts Kankkonen, a local volunteer, depicted by Wladimir Swertschkoff in 1856.
Date	7 June 1854
Location	Kokkola, Grand Duchy of Finland, Russian Empire
Result	Russian–Finnish victory

Belligerents
(Russia) Russian Empire: (Russia) Grand Duchy of Finland	United Kingdom

Commanders and leaders
Alexander Jakob von Wendt; Anders Donner sr.	James Hanway Plumridge

Strength
2 infantry companies 2 guns 100 local volunteers	2 paddle frigates 9 gunboats

Casualties and losses
None	16–18 dead, 52 including captured 2 gunboats

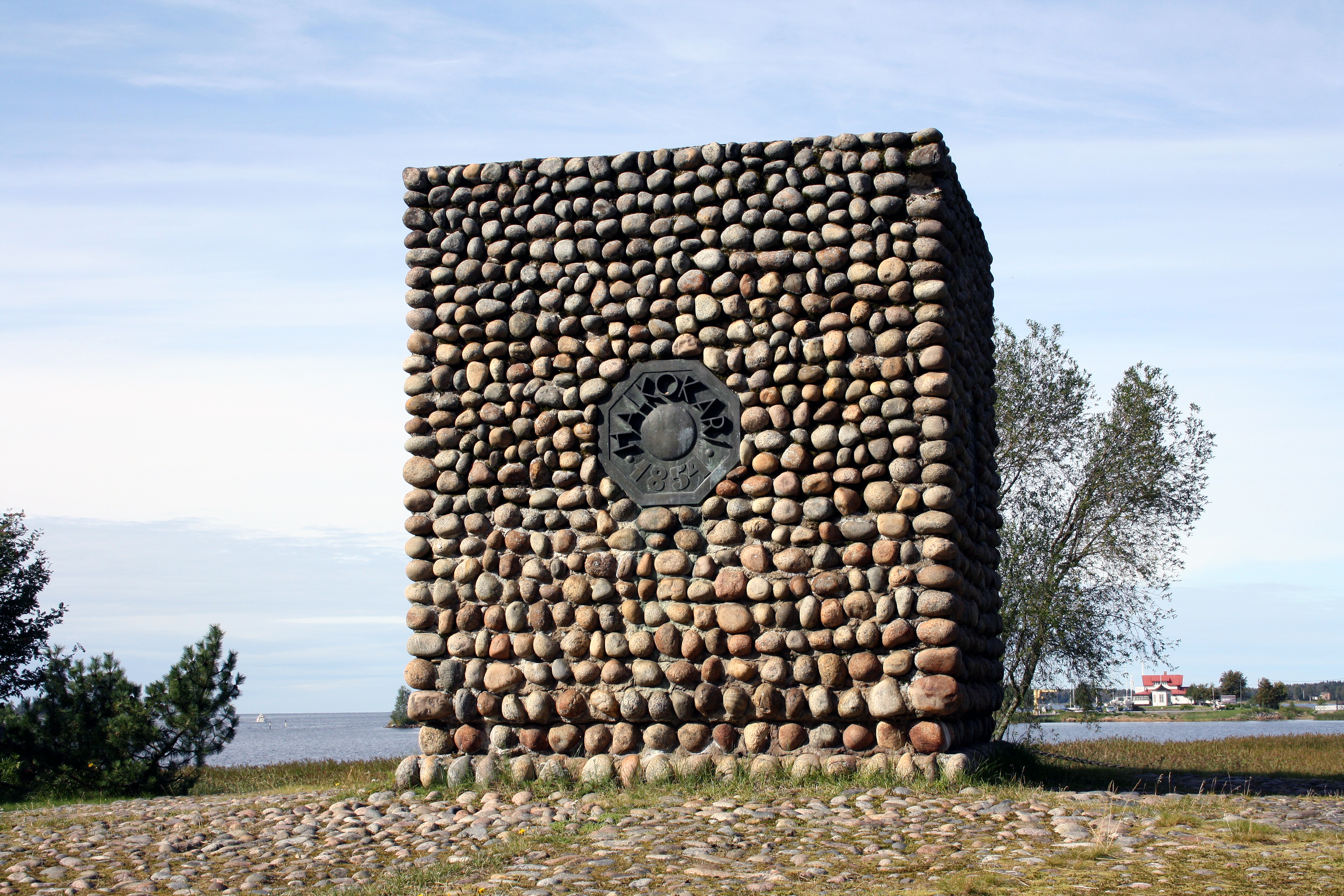
Monument of Halkokari.

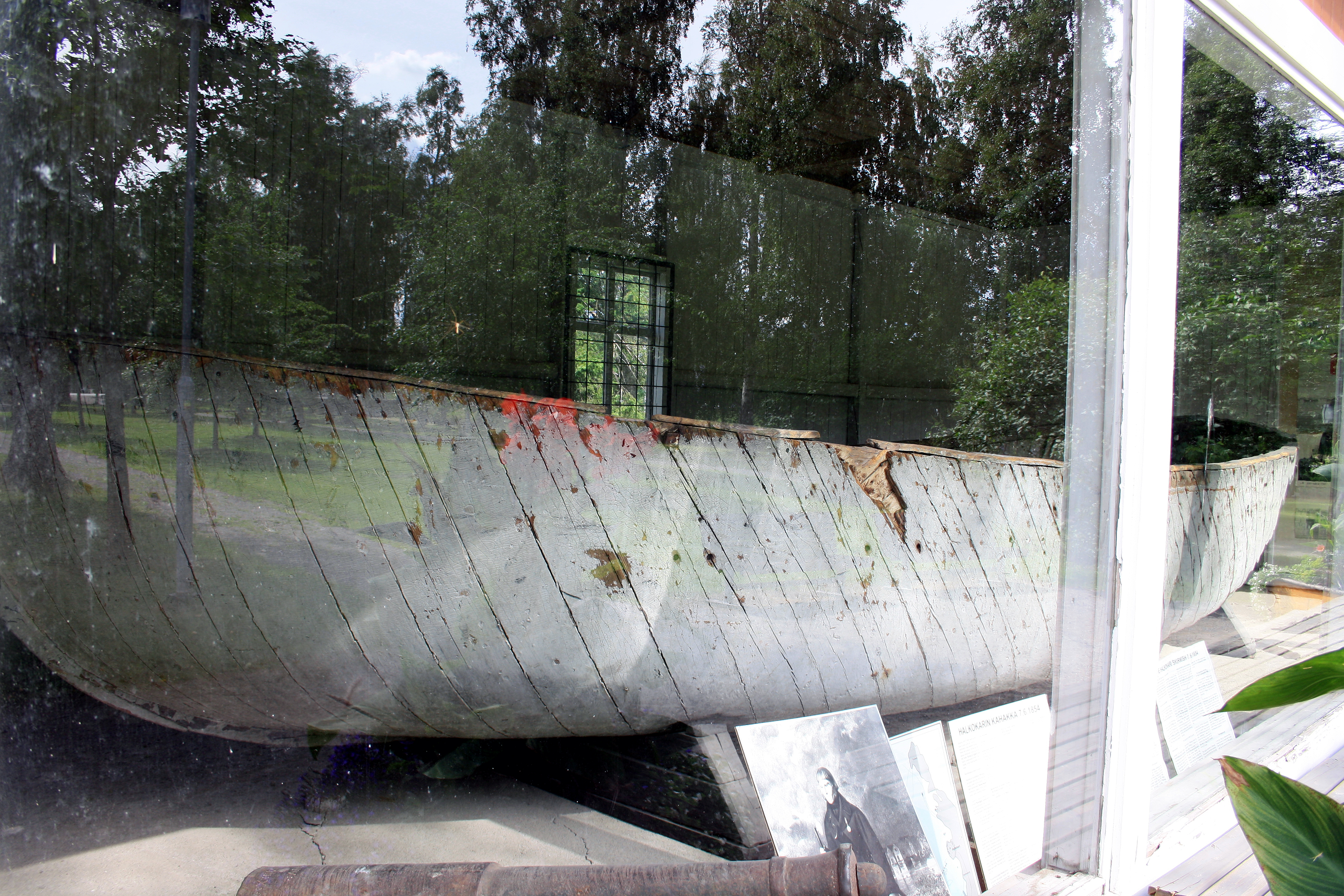
The 1854 captured British boat on display in Kokkola.

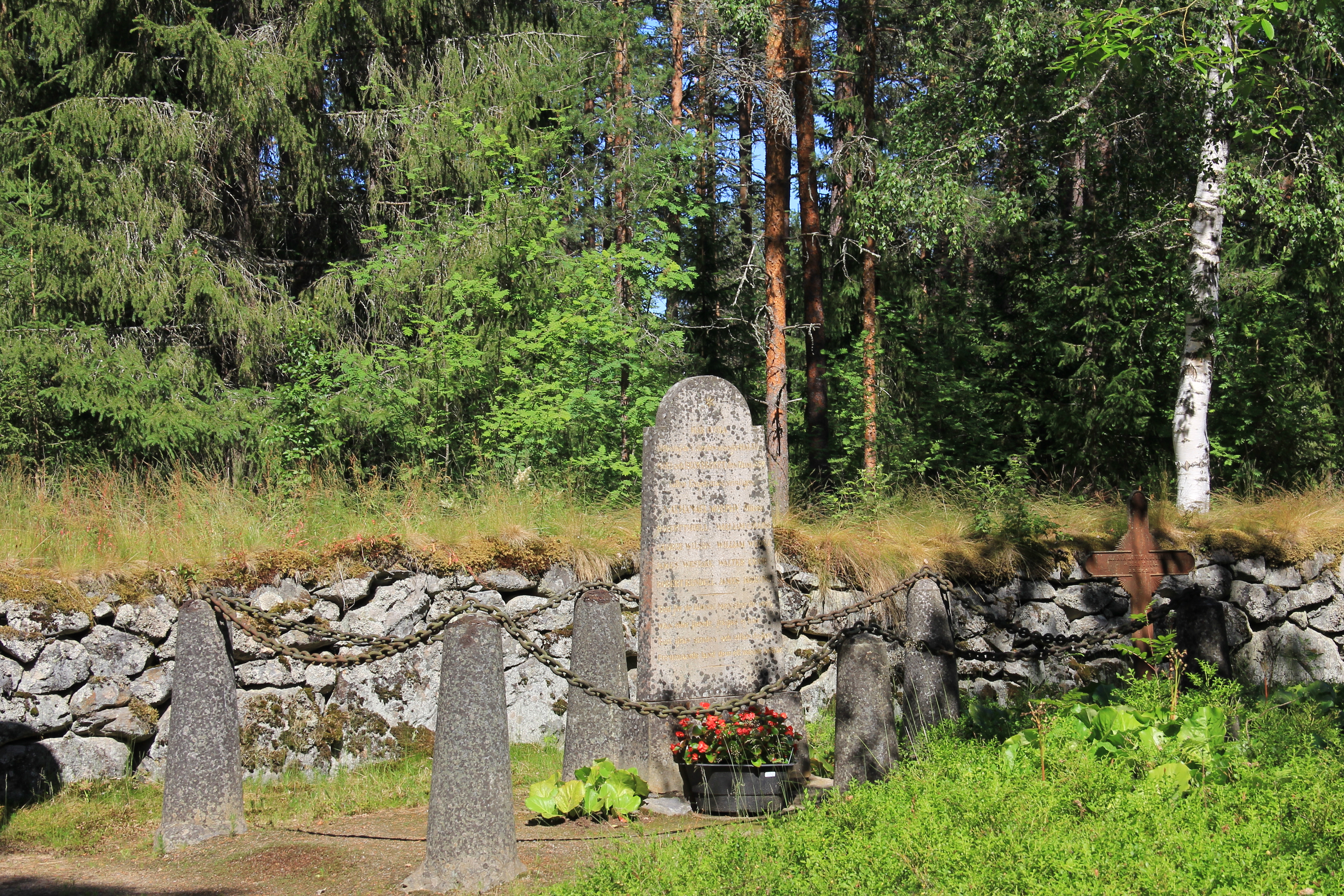
Grave memorial at Maria's graveyard in Kokkola. Nine mariners or sailors were buried there.

Skirmish of Halkokari, 7 June 1854, was a short coastal battle during the Åland War, a part of the Anglo–French Baltic Sea campaign in Crimean War. It was fought between a British landing detachment and the local coastal troops of Russian Grand Duchy of Finland at cape Halkokari, Kokkola.

Rear admiral James Hanway Plumridge, in command of four paddle frigates started his operation of ravaging the military and economic targets on the Finnish coast at Ekenäs in 19 May, and sailing west with his fleet continued with strikes at Hanko Peninsula, then on the Gulf of Bothnia in Raahe and Oulu. In cities the British burned ships, shipyards, tar stores and other warehouses. After Oulu the detachment was split in half and two of the ships, Vulture and Odin headed south towards the harbor city of Kokkola. The approach to Kokkola was rocky and treacherous and that would stop frigates with their guns from coming closer than some 11 kilometers from the harbor.

Finnish major general Alexander Jakob von Wendt, responsible for the coastal defense of the Gulf of Bothnia, hurried from Vaasa and brought with him two infantry companies and two guns. A rich local businessman and ship-owner, Anders Donner, organised a 100-man volunteer force to defend the harbor from Halkokari cape. A wooden palisade was erected to conceal the defenders from view, and a temporary bridge was also constructed over the harbor entrance. After unsuccessfully demanding the city to let its valuables to be destroyed, the British prepared to attack, without knowing there was a considerable armed force ready to defend. The Finno-Russian forces ambushed the surprised British landing force, which lost two of its nine gunboats. The whole battle lasted only 45 minutes. As a result, Kokkola was saved, but the British continued their coastal strikes the next summer. The next year, the British tried again in Kokkola, but now the city was well prepared. The Battle of Davidsberg was fought on 2 May 1855. The artillery duel between the British Navy and coastal forces lasted three hours, and the attackers were again repelled with minimal damage to Kokkola.

British total casualties including captured were 52, and in the end 16 or 18 of them perished. Nine fallen British marines and sailors were left behind and are buried in Maria graveyard in Kokkola. In addition to the gravestone, for the memory of the battle there is a monument at Halkokari and a captured English launch on exhibit on the edge of central Englanninpuisto. The boat was apparently in 2020 the only captured Royal Navy boat on display in the world.
