= Man Jumping =

British musical ensemble

Man Jumping was a British musical ensemble, formed in England in 1983, which included members from the much larger but disbanded musical collective The Lost Jockey. The band was conceived primarily as a recording project, whose musical agenda, according to saxophonist Andy Blake, was "to develop a post-minimalist musical language further towards rock, funk, and dance music, without The Lost Jockey's mistakes".

== Style and work ==
Man Jumping was formed by Andy Blake (saxes, flute), Martin Ditcham (percussion, drums), Orlando Gough (keyboards), John Lunn (bass, keyboards), Glyn Perrin (keyboards, cello), Charlie Seaward (keyboards, flute) and Schaun Tozer (keyboards). Their music drew on world and ethnic musics, electronics and funk to create an alternative world dance music. Orlando Gough said in an interview, in March 1985: "I suppose there is some kind of nebulous central core of ideas, which may be to do with us all having come out of systems music and our interest in foreign music but actually we are influenced by Frank Zappa, James Blood Ulmer, Bach".

A demo produced by Mike Hedges led to a contract with Bill Nelson's Cocteau Records, who released their first album Jump Cut in early 1985. Produced by Mike Hedges, Philip Bagenal and Man Jumping and recorded at Bagenal's own studio in Notting Hill, "Eastcote Productions", it attracted enthusiastic reviews. Time Out said: "Man Jumping merge the exacting algebra of systems music with the warmth, wit and passion of dance music and, in their own small way, are revolutionary, unique. I adore this album".

The original album, with the additional 12"s and alternative mixes, was reissued in 1999 on the Shaping the Invisible label. Music critic Richard Williams (journalist), reviewing the album on its re-release suggested, "So maybe Man Jumping, a brilliant and volatile notion which gave rise to brilliant and volatile music was never destined for longevity. As a unit they lasted four years and two albums, but their legacy is demonstrably durable, a testament to their originality of thought and commitment to an idea of what music might be rather than an imitation of what it already was. Created from theory and technique, it nevertheless liberated itself from formal restrictions and took shape with a thrilling sense of its own possibilities. Carefully planned but made in the moment, we might say. And, as it turns out, built to last." Jumpcut was selected as one of the records of the year by The Times,The Guardian and The Independent.

A second album appeared on vinyl and on CD in 1987 entitled World Service. This was also recorded at Eastcote Studios and produced by Philip Bagenal and Man Jumping. Martin Ditcham had, by this time, left to tour with Sade and Simon Limbrick had joined. In his review for AllMusic, Dave Lynch noted that "On the Rocks is startling, sometimes ominous but ultimately both funky and ethereal"; "Next up is the cruising and raga-esque It's Been Fun a richly detailed, tabla fuelled immersive wonder". "The album wraps up with the irresistible high spirits and power of Orlando Gough's The Wedding, a groovefest extraordinaire suggesting the Steve Reich Ensemble showed up at a massive global party bursting from intricate propulsive constructions into gangbusters choruses that left the revellers fully spent".

The state51 Conspiracy released both albums and the two 12" club mixes onto streaming sites starting on 15 November 2017. All tracks have been remastered and there are plans for remixes to be released in 2020. Jumpcut is now available on all streaming sites, having been remastered by Paul Golding.

Man Jumping worked with and composed music for various dance companies and toured with London Contemporary Dance Theatre and Second Stride.

Of the band's members, Schaun Tozer, John Lunn and Orlando Gough went on to have the most visible solo careers as composers - in music for both film and television, Glyn Perrin works as composer and performer, whilst Simon Limbrick and Martin Ditcham established careers as internationally renowned percussionists.

Jumpcut was re-issued on vinyl by Emotional Rescue in January 2020.

In 2019, Man Jumping curated a collection of remixes using the original analogue recordings converted to wav files, under the title "Man Jumping Remixed". The following artists contributed:- Khidja - Down The Locale; Khidja - Walk On, Bye; William Doyle - Belle Dux On The Beach/Walk On, Bye; Bullion - In The Jungle; Bullion - Walk On, Bye; Gilligan Moss - Sqeezi; Low Island - Belle Dux On The Beach; Low Island - On The Rocks; Reckonwrong - Sqeezi; Gengahr - Down The Locale.

Emotional Rescue released two vinyl EPs featuring some of these tracks in February 2020. One included the Khidja tracks and the other the mixes by Bullion, William Doyle, Reckonwrong and Gengahr.

== Discography ==
- Jumpcut (1985) Cocteau (vinyl)
- 12" Club Mixes (1985) Cocteau (vinyl)
- World Service (1987) (vinyl and CD)
- Jumpcut (1999) (with bonus tracks) Shaping the Invisible (CD)
- Jumpcut (Remastered) (2017) The State51 Conspiracy (streaming)
- Jumpcut (Remastered) (2019) Emotional Rescue (vinyl)
- Man Jumping Remixed 1 12" (2020) Emotional Rescue (vinyl and streaming)
- Man Jumping Remixed 2 12" (2020) Emotional Rescue (vinyl and straeming)
