= Palosaari, Vaasa =

Coordinates: 63.1101061°N 21.5973197°E

Palosaari Brändö
- Subdivision
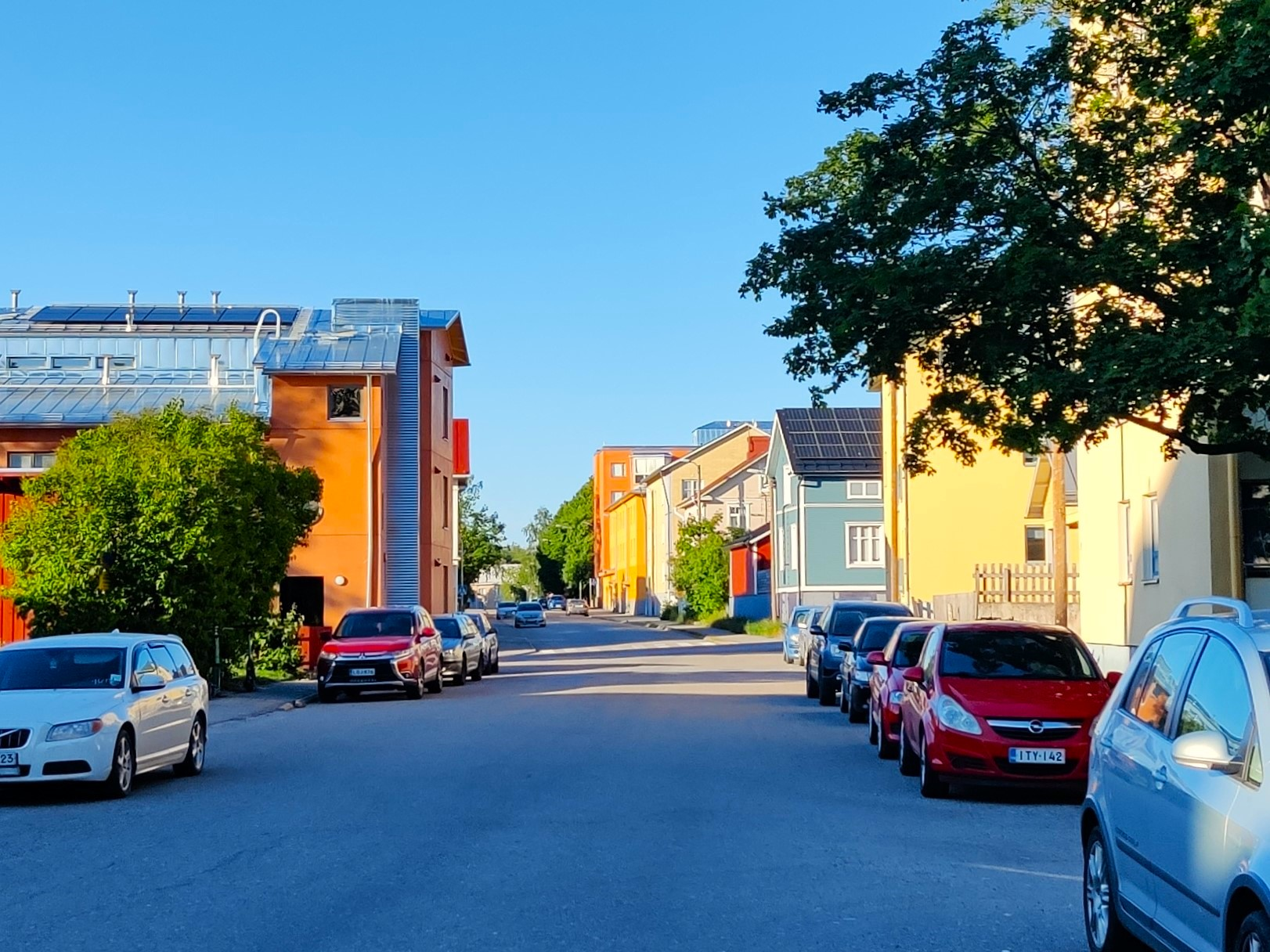
- Pikitehtaankatu street in Palosaari.

- Position of Palosaari within the City of Vaasa
- Interactive map of Palosaari
- Country: Finland
- Region: Ostrobothnia
- Sub-region: Vaasa
- Municipality: Vaasa
- Subdivision regions: Yliopisto, Onkilahden ranta, Sunti, Palosaaren keskus, Vikinga
- Population (2024): 6,628 (Note: Combined population of Palosaari regions.)
- Postal codes: 65200
- Major district number: 04

Palosaari (Swedish: Brändö) is a major district of the city of Vaasa, Finland about two kilometers (1.2 mi) north from the Vaasa city centre. It is a former island, that is due to tectonic uplift now connected to the mainland. Palosaari is an old working-class area that has gradually become a student neighbourhood since the 1980s. Among other educational institutions the University of Vaasa is based there.

== Subdivisions ==
Palosaari major district is divided into five subdistricts: Yliopisto (Swedish: Universitet), Sunti (Swedish: Sund), Onkilahden ranta (Swedish: Metviksstrand), Palosaaren keskus (Swedish: Brändö centrum) and Vikinga.
