= Orlando Gough =

British composer (born 1953)

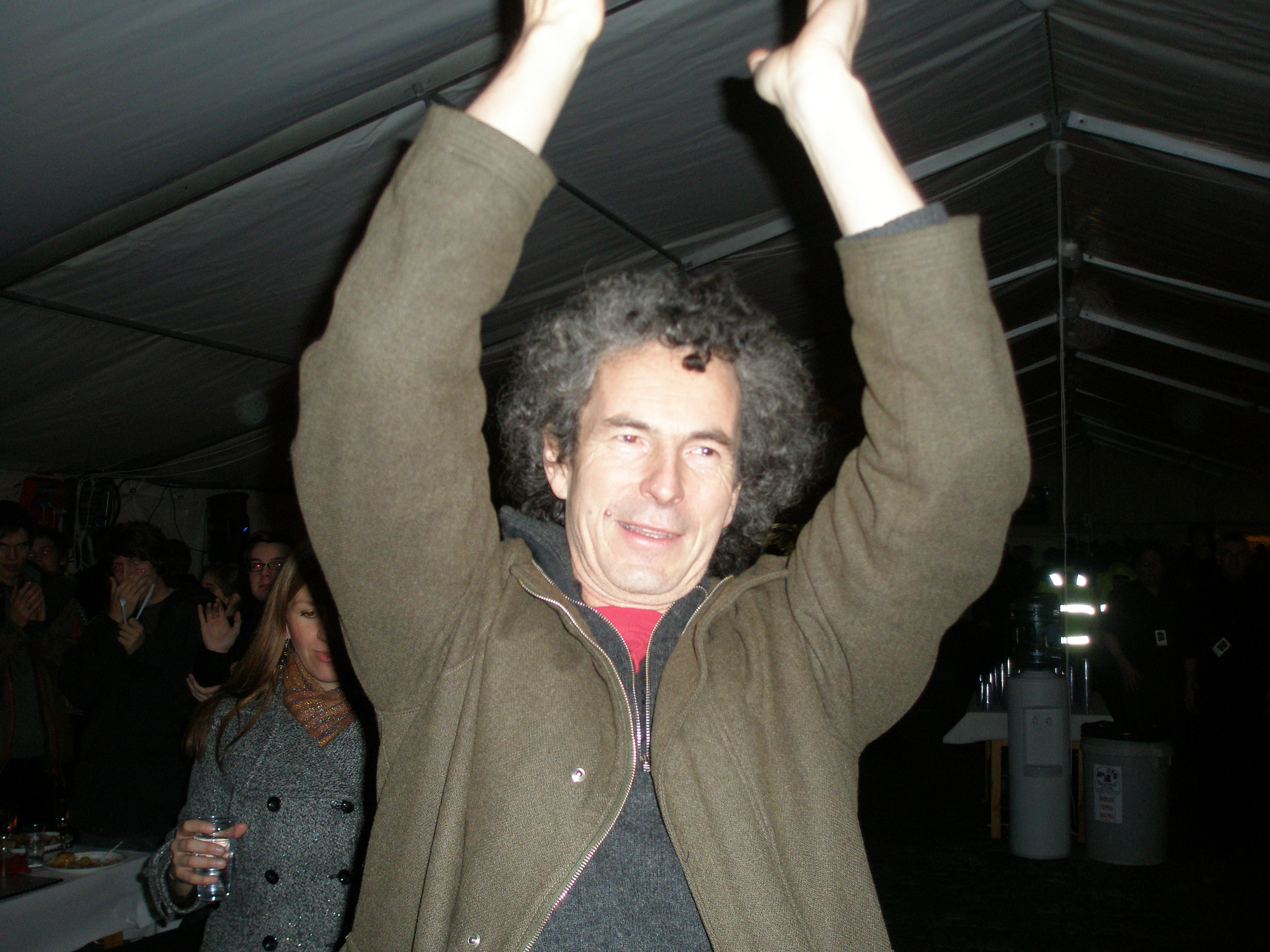
Orlando Gough after the closing ceremony of Stavanger 2008

Orlando Gough (/ɡɒf/ GOF; born 1953) is a British composer, educated at Oxford, and noted for projects written for ballet, contemporary dance and theatre. Collaborators have included Siobhan Davies, Alain Platel, Shobana Jeyasingh and Ashley Page of The Royal Ballet. He is artistic director of The Shout, which he founded in 1998 with Richard Chew. The choir won the Time Out Award for Classical Artist of the Year in 2001. He released one album titled Message from the Border that was released on Catalyst/BMG Records. His 2001 commission from Fretwork, called 'Birds on Fire' was recorded by them for Harmonia Mundi under the same title and was released in 2008. He composed the music for the closing ceremony of the 2008 European Capital of Culture, Stavanger. Members of the choir include Carol Grimes, Melanie Pappenheim and Manickam Yogeswaran. In 2010 the Turner Contemporary commissioned Gough to compose a work for its opening ceremonies: "The Red Volcano" – for community choir and orchestra, had its World Premiere in April 2011 conducted by Anthony Castro.

== Life ==
Gough first came to prominence on the British music scene in the early 1980s as a co-founder of minimalist music ensemble - The Lost Jockey. It was initially set up to perform the works of 'systems music' composers such as Steve Reich and Philip Glass. However, before long it switched to compositions by the group's own composers, of whom Gough was one of the most active. In live concerts (as well as on a BBC Radio broadcast) he performed on piano, keyboards and tuned percussion. Around 1984 the ever-growing (and increasingly unmanageable) ensemble slimmed down to a septet called Man Jumping, again featuring Gough – who contributed several compositions to their two critically acclaimed albums.

Gough's music for opera includes The Mathematics of a Kiss (a 1989 short TV opera composed with Man Jumping cohort John Lunn), Critical Mass (2007, Almeida Opera), and The Finnish Prisoner (premiered in 2007 by a cast including members of the Finnish National Opera). In 2010 Gough was commissioned to write a short opera for the Royal Opera House's ROH2 OperaShots initiative. The result was A Ring a lamp a thing with a libretto by Caryl Churchill.

In 2011 and 2012 Gough wrote Transmission 2011 and XX Scharnhorst which had been commissioned as part of a two-year project by the Thames Festival Trust. Both of them are site specific to HMS Belfast.

In 2011 two drummers performed Transmission on HMS Belfast using the vessel for some parts as an instrument. The piece is a duet in military snare drumming style and lasts about five minutes. The world premiere was as part of the Thames Festival 2011 on 10 September.

In 2012 the world premiere for XX Scharnhorst was performed on HMS Belfast on 8 September 2012 again as part of the Thames Festival. The piece is inspired by the Battle of North Cape where the German battleship Scharnhorst sunk by Royal Navy warships, including HMS Belfast. The piece is formed of six parts: Leaving, Drill, Listening to the Ship, Lullaby, Battle, and Aftermath. It lasts about 30 minutes including the approximately five-minute-long battle scene. As in Transmission, HMS Belfast is used in XX Scharnhorst in some of the drumming as an instrument (Drill, Battle). The songs sung by the women's choir are two hybrid songs. The first is based on Gracie Fields' "Wish Me Luck as You Wave Me Goodbye" and the Russian song "Katyusha" (Leaving). The second is based on Vera Lynn's "White Cliffs of Dover" and a Georgian lullaby "Nana" (Lullaby). It also includes two German songs "Ich hab die Nacht geträumet" (Listening to the Ship) and "Auf einem Seemannsgrab" (Aftermath). The performances included the Bluebird Chorus, the Deutscher Chor London (dir. Barbara Höfling) and a group of percussionists from Guildhall School of Music and Drama, Royal Academy of Music, Royal College of Music, Trinity College of Music and directed by Emma Barnard.

Gough, a mathematics graduate, authored the 1987 book The Complete Advanced Level Mathematics. He is married to knitwear designer, Joanna Osborne, co-author of several knitting books, and has two sons, Daniel and Milo. He has two older brothers, the architect Piers Gough, and Adam Jamie Gough, an academic at the University of Sheffield.
