= List of lighthouses and lightvessels in Finland =

This is a list of lighthouses and lightvessels in Finland.

== Lighthouses ==
| Name | Image | Water body | Location | Built | Notes |
|---|---|---|---|---|---|
| Bengtskär Lighthouse | | Archipelago Sea | Bengtskär, 25 km southwest of the town of Hanko | 1906 | At 52 metres, this is the tallest light within all of the Nordic countries. |
| Buskskär Lighthouse | | | Buskskär | Construction date unknown | The status of this light is unknown. Presumably destroyed. |
| Gustavsvärn Lighthouse | | | Hanko | 1949 (station established in 1865) | |
| Harmaja | | Gulf of Finland | Helsinki | original - 1883 tower raised - 1900 | |
| Helsinki Lighthouse | | Gulf of Finland | 24 kilometers south of Helsinki city center | 1958 | |
| Holstanäs Lighthouse | | | Korpo, Pargas | Construction date is unknown | |
| Hyöky | | Gulf of Finland | Tervasaari, harbor of Hamina | 1912 | Commissioned by Russian Navy, captured by Finland in World War I, decommissioned as a lightship in 1959 |
| Jussarö Lighthouse | | | Sundharun, Jussarö, Ekenäs | 1922, 1953, 1962, 1963 | |
| Jänissaari Lighthouse | | | Jänissaari, just outside of Turku | Construction date is unknown | |
| Kaitkivi Lighthouse | | | | | |
| Kalholm Light | | | Kalholm, Kimitoön | Construction date is unknown | |
| Kalkkiniemi Lighthouse | | | Located outside of Turku | Construction date is unknown | |
| Kallo Lighthouse | | Gulf of Bothnia | Pori (N 61° 35.670 E 021° 27.743) | 1884 | More images at Commons |
| Keskiniemi Light | | Gulf of Bothnia | northwestern promontory of Hailuoto island | 1858 | |
| Koskela Light | | Gulf of Bothnia | southern shore of Letonniemi promontory in Taskila district of the City of Oulu | 1940 | Due to the glacial rebound the tower is located 150 yards (140 m) away from the coastline, and is almost completely hidden by the shrub. |
| Kylmäpihlaja Lighthouse | | Gulf of Bothnia | Kylmäpihlaja island near Rauma (61°8′40″N, 21°18′10″E) | 1952 | Hotel attached to lighthouse |
| Marjaniemi Lighthouse | | Gulf of Bothnia | westernmost point of Hailuoto island | 1871 | |
| Porkkala Lighthouse | | | Kallbådan, Porkkalanniemi, Kirkkonummi | 1928 (lightship station established in the year of 1858) | |
| Relandersgrund | | Helsinki Harbour | Retired, docked in Helsinki, in use as a restaurant ship (2013) | 1888 | |
| Rautakallio Light | Rautakallio Light | Gulf of Bothnia | island of Rautakallio in the narrows between the mainland and the island of Hailuoto | | |
| Rivinletto Light | | Gulf of Bothnia | Kaasamatala, a small island at the mouth of the river Kiiminkijoki in Haukipudas, Oulu | 1939 | |
| Russarö Lighthouse | | | Båklandet, Hanko | 1863 (station established in 1838) | This light is often referred to as the "Eye of Hanko". |
| Rönnskär Lighthouse | | Gulf of Finland | 59° 56' 7.8" N, 24° 23' 29.2" E | 1814 | |
| Säppi Lighthouse | | Gulf of Bothnia | outside the city of Pori in the island of Säppi | 1873 | |
| Söderskär Lighthouse | | Gulf of Finland | Located on the island of Söderskär in Porvoo | 1862 | |
| Suomen leijona | | Baltic Sea | 59°28.362′N 20°48.784′E | 2005 | |
| Suomenlinna Church | | Gulf of Finland | Suomenlinna, Helsinki (60.147866°N 24.986229°E) | 1929 | The central dome also serves as a lighthouse. The light blinks the letter "H" for Helsinki in Morse code. |
| Tankar Lighthouse | | Gulf of Bothnia | Öja Island, Gulf of Bothnia, approximately 15 km north-west of Kokkola (Karleby) municipality. (Lat 63° 56" 59' Lon. 22° 50" 48') | 1889 | |
| Utö Lighthouse | | Archipelago Sea | on the island of Utö, in Väståboland municipality | Original 1753; Rebuilt 1814 | |

== See also ==
- Lists of lighthouses and lightvessels
