= Kalbådagrund =

Kalbådagrund may refer to:

- Kalbådagrund Lighthouse, Finland
- Lightship Kalbådagrund, Russian Empire, Finland
- The next name of Lightship Äransgrund, Finland
- Kalbådagrund shoal, Gulf of Finland, the location of all of the above
