= Axel Hampus Dalström =

Finnish architect (1829–1882)

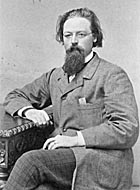
- Born: 22 March 1829; Helsinki, Grand Duchy of Finland
- Died: 19 March 1882 (aged 52); Helsinki, Grand Duchy of Finland
- Occupation: Architect
- Buildings: Old Student House; Marjaniemi Lighthouse; Säppi Lighthouse; Savonlinna Cathedral

Axel Hampus Dalström (22 March 1829 – 19 March 1882), was a Finnish architect. He was the director of the National Board of Public Building from 1869 to 1882. He is best known for the Old Student House in Helsinki, as well as seven lighthouses he designed in the 1870s.

== Works ==
- Sälskär Lighthouse, Hammarland (1868)
- Old Student House, Helsinki (1870)
- Marjaniemi Lighthouse, Hailuoto (1871)
- Ulkokalla Lighthouse, Kalajoki (1871)
- Säppi Lighthouse, Luvia (1873)
- Oulun Lyseon Lukio, Oulu (expansion 1875, with Florentin Granholm)
- Sälgrund Lighthouse, Kaskinen (1875)
- The Guards Manege, Helsinki (1877)
- Heinäluoto Lighthouse, Salmi (1877)
- Savonlinna Cathedral, Savonlinna (1879)
- Hanhipaasi Lighthouse, Sortavala (1879)
- Svenska normallyceum, Helsinki (1880)
