= Lightship Kemi =

Finnish lightvessel

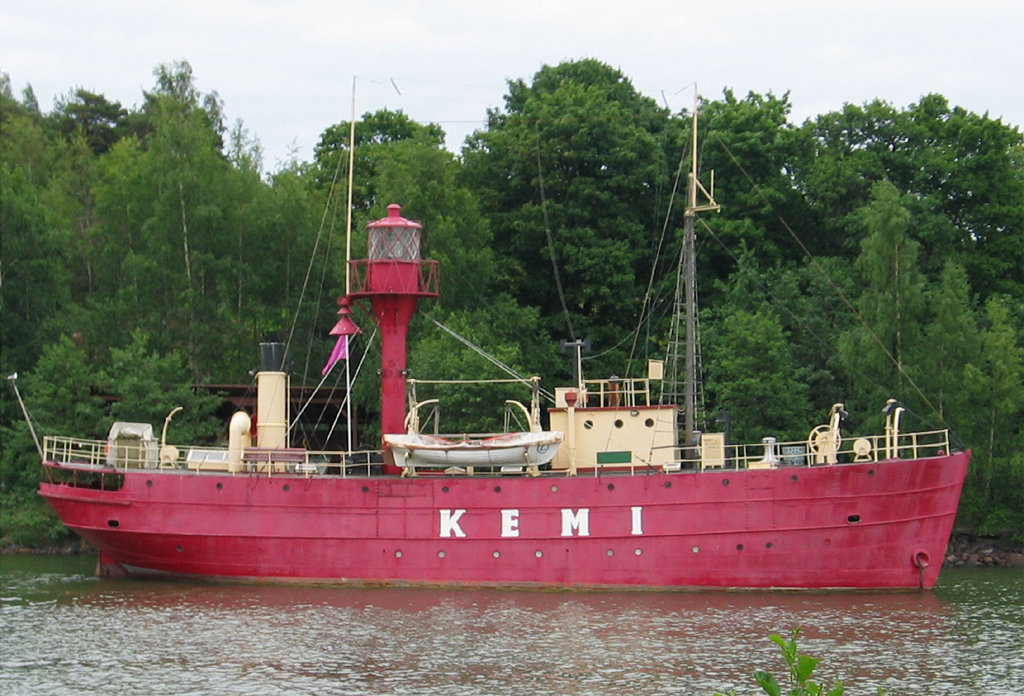
- Kemi by the shore of the Hylkysaari Island, Helsinki

History

Finland
- Name: Äransgrund; Relandersgrund; Relanderinmatala; Rauma
- Builder: Björneborgs Mekaniska Verkstad, Pori
- Laid down: 1900
- Launched: 1901
- In service: 1901
- Out of service: Museum ship since 1975
- Status: Museum ship

The Lightship Kemi (Finnish: Majakkalaiva Kemi) was the last lightship in use in Finland . It was completed at the Björneborgs Mekaniska Verkstad, (now Pori, Finand) in 1901. The ship's name varied depending on its location: Äransgrund (replacing Lightship Äransgrund), Relandersgrund (cf. Relandersgrund), Relanderinmatala (named after its location at the Relander shallow), and Rauma (after Rauma). Now Kemi is a museum ship operated by the Maritime Museum of Finland.
