= Luvia =

- Former municipality
- Luvian kunta Luvia kommun
- Coat of arms

- Location of Luvia in Finland
- Coordinates: 61°21′40″N 021°37′30″E
- Country: Finland
- Region: Satakunta
- Sub-region: Pori sub-region
- Charter: 1870
- Consolidated: 2017

Government
  - Municipal manager: Kari Ojalahti
- Time zone: UTC+2 (EET)
  - Summer (DST): UTC+3 (EEST)
- Climate: Dfb
- Website: www.luvia.fi

Luvia is a former municipality of Finland. It was merged to Eurajoki on 1 January 2017.

It was located in the province of Western Finland, part of the Satakunta region. The municipality covered an area of 861.20 square kilometres (332.51 sq mi) of which 692.07 km^{2} (267.21 sq mi) was water.

The dominant municipal language was Finnish.

== Villages ==
Prior to its consolidation into Eurajoki in 2017, Luvia consisted of the following villages:

- rural: Hanninkylä, Korpi, Lemlahti, Luodonkylä, Löytty, Mikkola, Niemenkylä, Perä, Sassila, Sitlahti, Väipäre
- parish: Sitlahti, Lankoori, Murro, Määrvuori

== See also ==
- Säppi
- Säppi Lighthouse
