= Savonlinna Cathedral =

Coordinates: 61°52′6″N 28°52′38″E

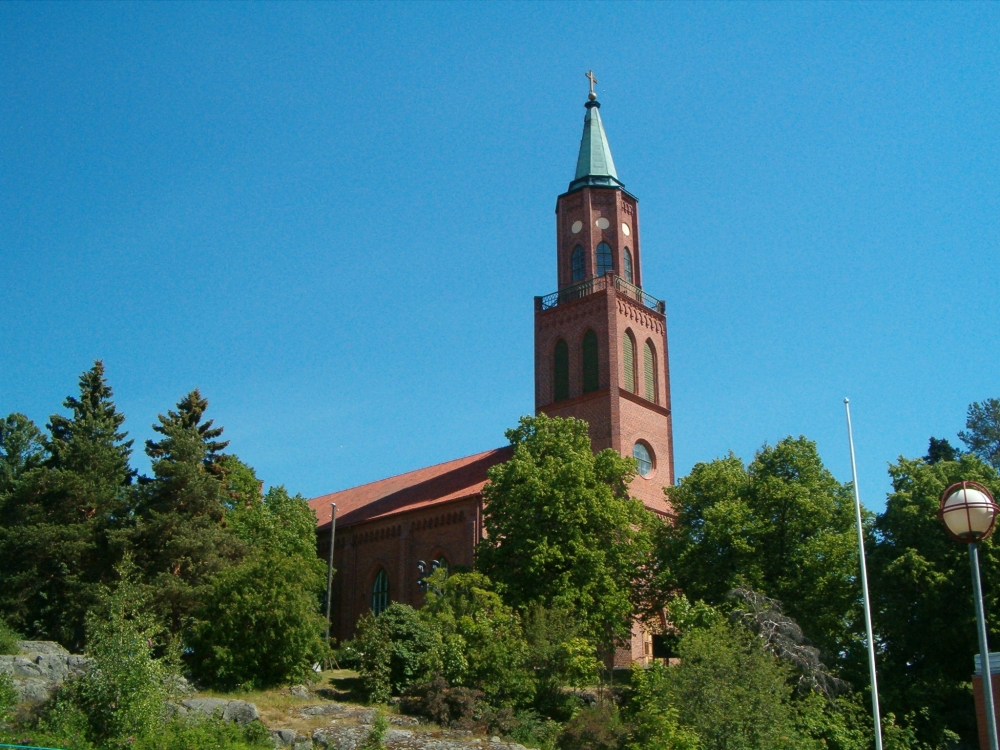
Savonlinna cathedral

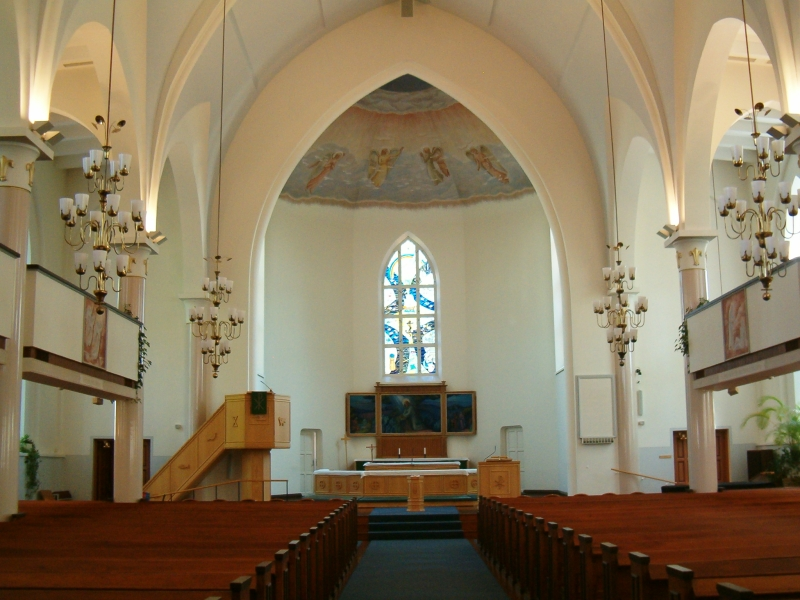
The altar of the cathedral

Savonlinna Cathedral (Finnish: Savonlinnan tuomiokirkko, Swedish: Nyslotts domkyrka) is located in Savonlinna, Finland. It was built between 1874 and 1878 and designed by architect Axel Hampus Dalström in the Gothic Revival style. It has room for 1000 people.

== History ==
The people of Savonlinna had no church of their own and were obliged to go to the church in Sääminki. In 1850, governor Aleksander Thesleff gave orders to build a church in Savonniemi. The actual construction began in 1874.

In 1896, the new Diocese of Savonlinna was founded and the Savonlinna church became a cathedral. The first bishop was Gustaf Johansson. In 1925, the bishop's seat was moved to Vyborg, but the church still retained "cathedral" as its name.

During the Winter War on 1 May 1940, Savonlinna was bombed, and the church was damaged. It was restored in 1947–1948 by architect Bertel Liljeqvist. In 1990–1991, it was renovated by Ansu Ånström.
