= Kalbådagrund Lighthouse =

Lighthouse in Finland

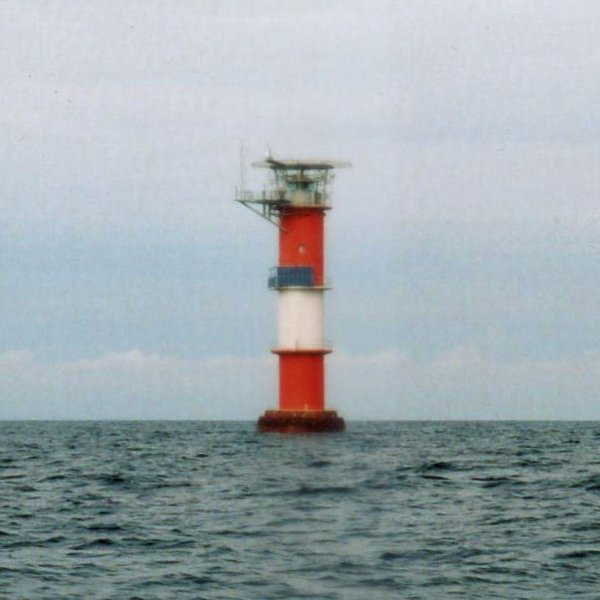
- The lighthouse in the Gulf of Finland in 2010
- Location: Gulf of Finland, 12 km (7.5 mi) from shore and about 25 km (15 mi) south of Porvoo
- Coordinates: 59°59.06′N 25°36.06′E

Tower
- Constructed: 1952
- Foundation: concrete, Caisson
- Automated: 1953
- Height: total 27 m (89 ft), lamp 20.7 m (68 ft)
- Markings: Red, white (stripe)
- Fog signal: One blast every 30 seconds
- Racon: K

Light
- First lit: 1953
- Focal height: 27 m (89 ft)
- Lens: LFI(4) W 30s
- Range: 12 nautical miles (22 km)
- Characteristic: White flashing light

The Kalbådagrund Lighthouse is a lighthouse located on a dangerous Kalbådagrund shoal near the centerline of the Gulf of Finland about 12 km (7.5 mi) from shore and about 25 km (15 mi) south of Porvoo and was Finland's first caisson lighthouse, replacing the lightship Kalbådagrund.

== Construction ==
Construction of the lighthouse began in the spring of 1950 on the Suomenlinna shipyard. The tower was erected during the autumn of 1952, the caisson was sunk to a depth of 10 m (33 ft) about 12 km (7.5 mi) from shore and about 25 km (15 mi) south of Porvoo. The lighthouse stands 27 m (89 ft) above sea level and was originally built to replace a lightship station. The design of the lighthouse is similar to that of several Swedish Baltic Sea lighthouses and she was painted with red and white horizontal bands.

== Service ==
The lighthouse's white flashing light was lit for the first time in the autumn of 1953. In 1977, the tower's construction was reinforced and a helicopter landing pad was built on the roof. Today she is fitted with incorporating keeper's quarters and three galleries. The lighthouse is operated from Harmaja pilot station and can only be accessed by boat.
