= Panimoravintola Beer Hunter's =

Finnish microbrewery and restaurant

Old Buck whisky bottle

Panimoravintola Beer Hunter's is a Finnish brewery, distillery and a restaurant. Founded in 1998 and located in the city of Pori, the brewery restaurant started distilling malt whisky in 2001.

The brewed beers are sold under the brand of "Mufloni". The names comes from the mouflon sheep that live on the lighthouse island of Säppi. The Beer Hunter's Mufloni Stout was awarded in the year 2000 as the best of show at the Helsinki Beer Festival.

In December 2004, Beer Hunter's launched the first Finnish malt whisky: the Old Buck. Old Buck second release was chosen by Jim Murray as the "European Mainland Whisky of the Year" in his "Whisky Bible 2009". Old Buck is a very small batch whisky, each batch usually contains 60-150 bottles per batch. In their first 13 years of whisky making, they have only made 4000 liters of whisky at the restaurant brewery. Their pot still has a capacity of 150 liters.

Next door to Beer Hunter's is the "Steak & Whisky House Galle". Steak & Whisky House Galle is a restaurant that specializes in whisky and cigars. In its 53rd issue, the British "Whisky Magazine" selected Galle as one of the best whisky restaurants in the world (another Finnish whisky restaurant that was selected is Olutravintola Pikkulintu).
