= Rautakallio Light =

Coordinates: 64°53.89′N 24°45.29′E

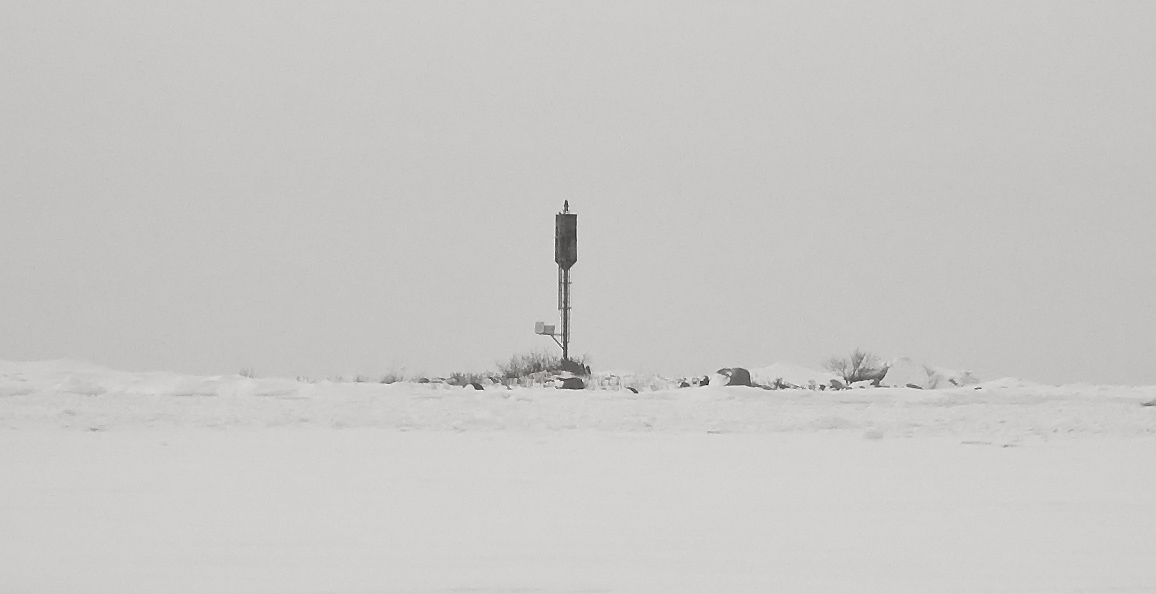
Rautakallio island and fishing light

Rautakallio Light is a fishing light located on a small island of Rautakallio in the narrows between the mainland and the island of Hailuoto in Finland. The island and the light both lie within the municipal boundaries of Siikajoki near the municipal border of Hailuoto. The coastal route between Raahe and Oulu runs south of the island.

The sector light has a tubular structure and is painted grey. The light also has a radar reflector. The focal plane of the light is 9.0 metres (29 1/2 feet) and it has a range of 2.1 nmi (3.9 km). It displays a red flash 60 times per minute visible in all directions. The light has a limited time of operation.

== Sources ==
- Finnish List of Lights (in Finnish and Swedish). Finnish Maritime Administration. 2007. p. 42. ISBN 978-951-49-0873-6.
