= Lightship Äransgrund =

Finnish lightvessel

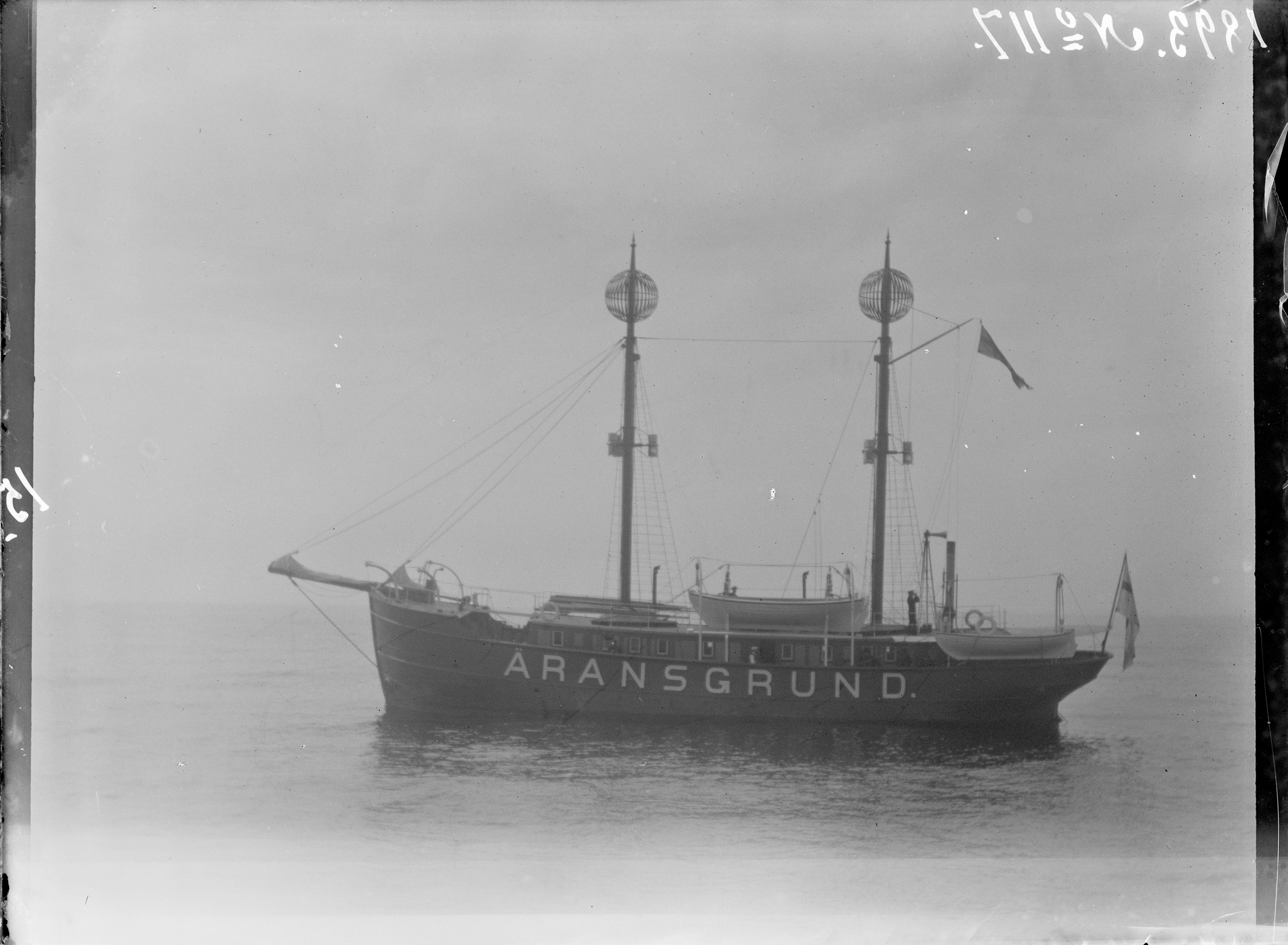
- Äransgrund at sea (cca.1893)

History

Finland
- Name: Äransgrund; Kalbådagrund; Arle
- Builder: Crichton & Co, Turku
- Launched: 1892
- Out of service: 1953

The lightship Äransgrund was a Finnish lightship.

It was built at the Crichton & Co shipyard, Turku. Initially it was unpowered, equipped with sails and stationed off the coast of Helsinki. It became inconvenient to have the ship unpowered, and in 1901 it was replaced by a new ship with the same name (which was eventually renamed to Kemi).

In 1930 an engine was installed and it started operating under the name Kalbådagrund, stationed at the Kallbådagrund shoal south of Porvoo as a replacement of the previous Russian Lightship Kalbådagrund. It operated until 1953, when the first Finnish caisson lighthouse, Kalbådagrund Lighthouse, was installed instead of it. The ship was sold to a private individual and it operated as a dry cargo ship Arle in 1956.
