= Jussarö =

Finnish island

Coordinates: 59°49′36″N 023°34′06″E

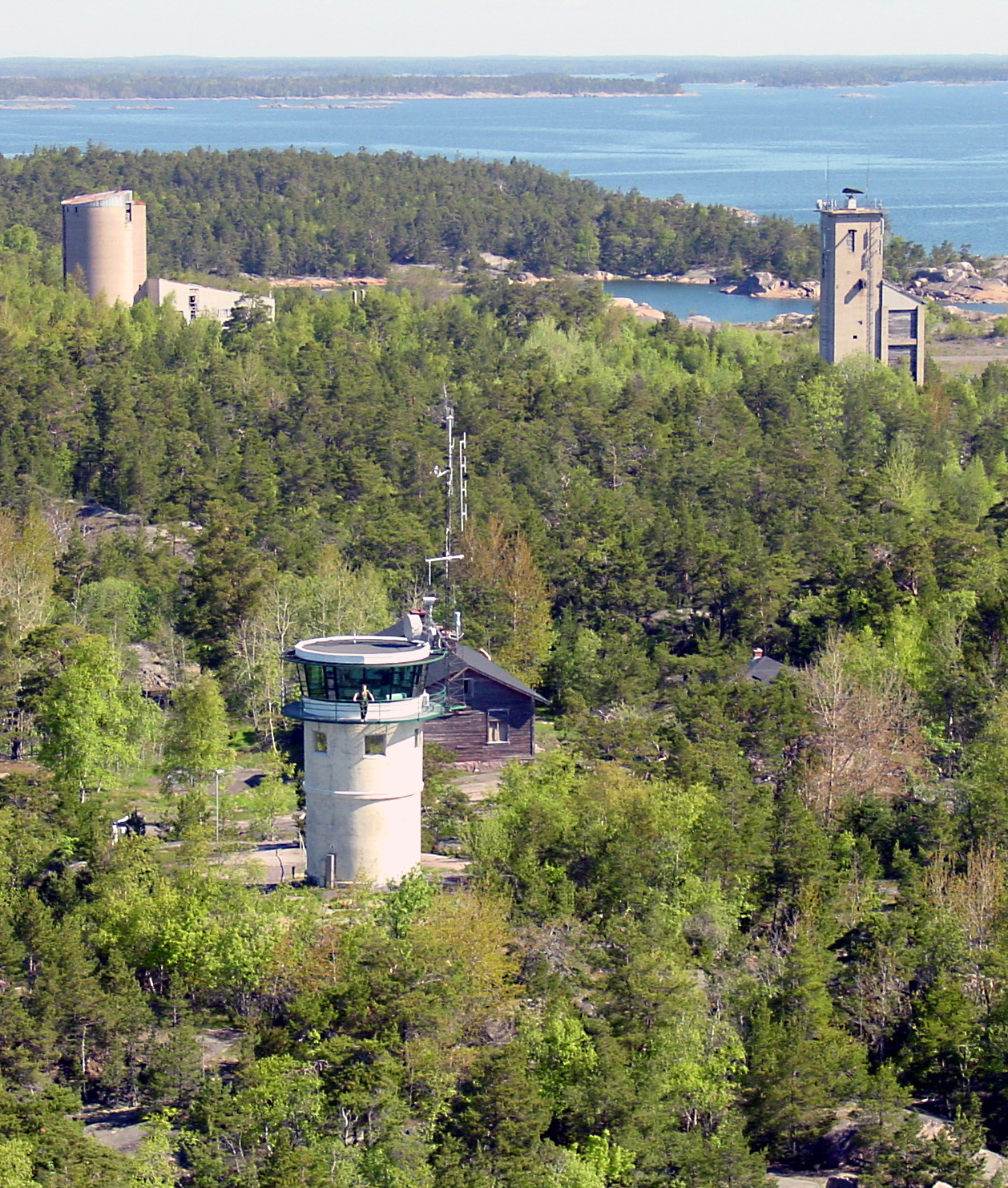
Jussarö island in 2004.

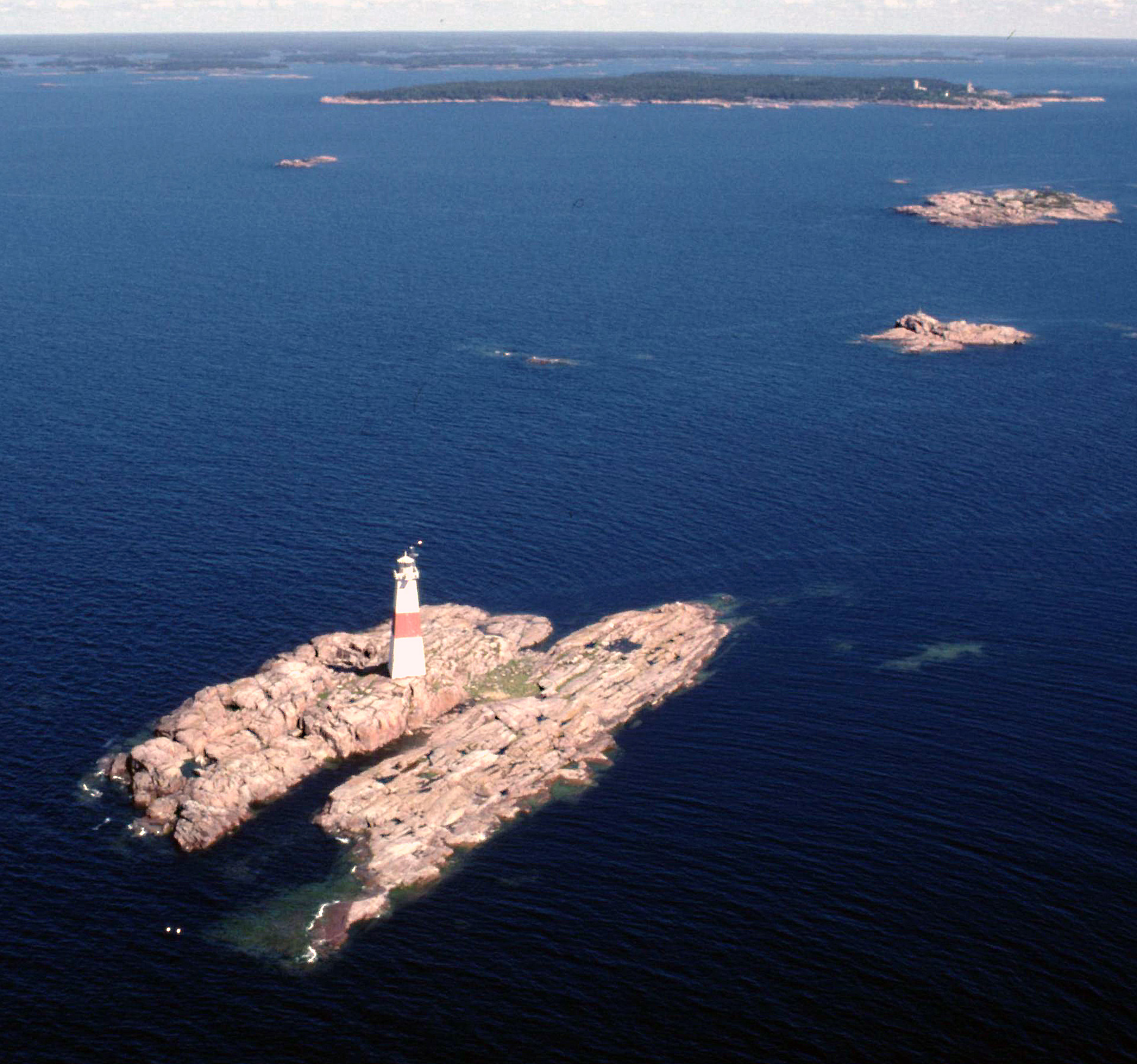
Jussarö Lighthouse on the Sundharu islet south from Jussarö island.

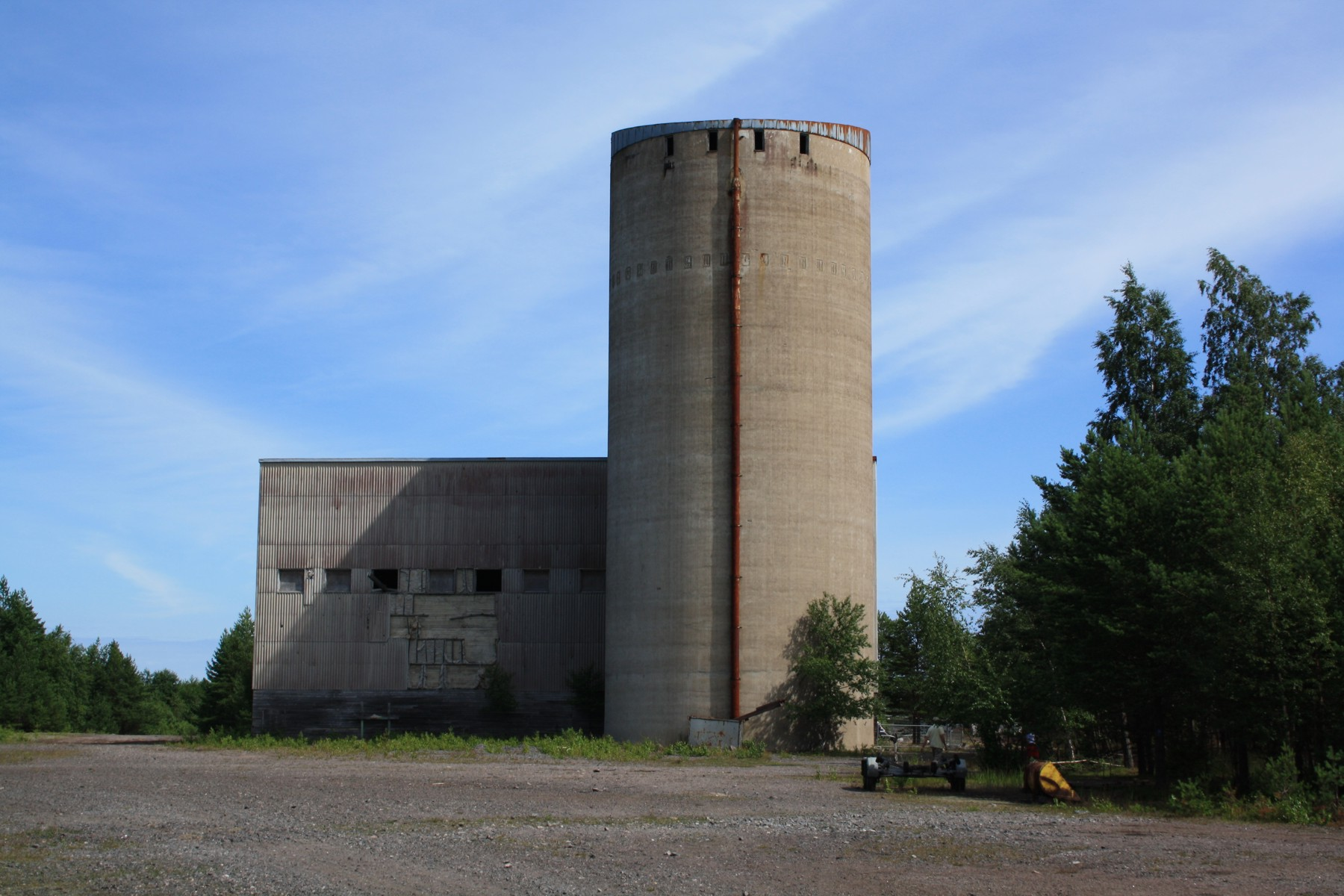
A building from the mining period on Jussarö.

Jussarö (Finnish: Jussaari) is a Finnish island in the Gulf of Finland. It is located in the municipality of Ekenäs, Raseborg, Finland. Jussarö is known for the Jussarö Lighthouse. There is also an iron ore mine, but it was closed in 1967. The western part of Jussarö is included in Ekenäs Archipelago National Park.

== History ==
According to church records, the first permanent residents arrived on Jussarö in 1774. By the mid-1780s, there were already six families living on the island. In 1834 promising iron ore deposit were discovered in the northern part of Jussarö. From 1834 to 1837 iron ore was mined on the island by a workforce of 14–18 men. Mining was temporarily suspended from 1838 to 1839 but resumed in 1840 and continued until 1861.

In 1891 was built on the southern tip of the island and in 1922 Finland’s first unmanned lighthouse was built on Sundharu islet, southwest of Jussarö.

In 1959 Oy Vuoksenniska Ab initiated the construction of a mine on the island and in 1961 the first load of iron ore concentrate was transported to Koverhar (near Lappohja). The mine was operated until 1967 and was closed since iron ore prices were declining while production costs were increasing.

In Jussarö, some abandoned buildings still remain, which were used by the military until 2005 for urban war simulations. Many semi-destroyed structures remain from that time, featured in the 2019 TV-series Abandoned Engineering. Jussarö is known as the only ghost town in Finland. Part of the island is open to visitors.

== Lilla Jussarö ==
Approximately 200 metres (660 ft) to the north of Jussarö is Lilla Jussarö. This smaller island, consisting of a few houses and a harbour was once owned by Nokia.
