= Gulf of Bothnia =

Northernmost arm of the Baltic Sea – between Sweden and Finland

Coordinates: 63°N 20°E

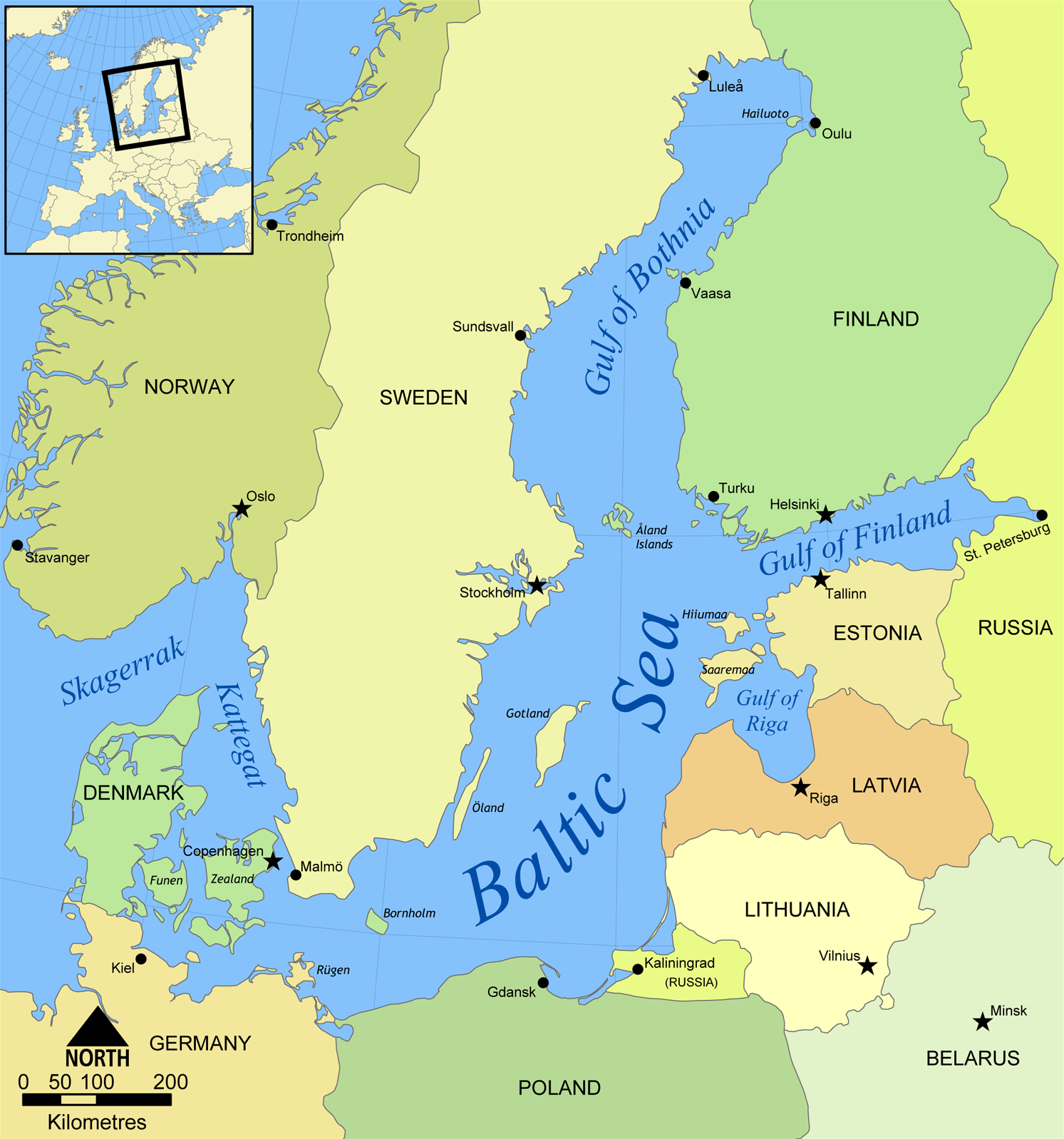
Map of the Baltic Sea, showing the Gulf of Bothnia in the upper half

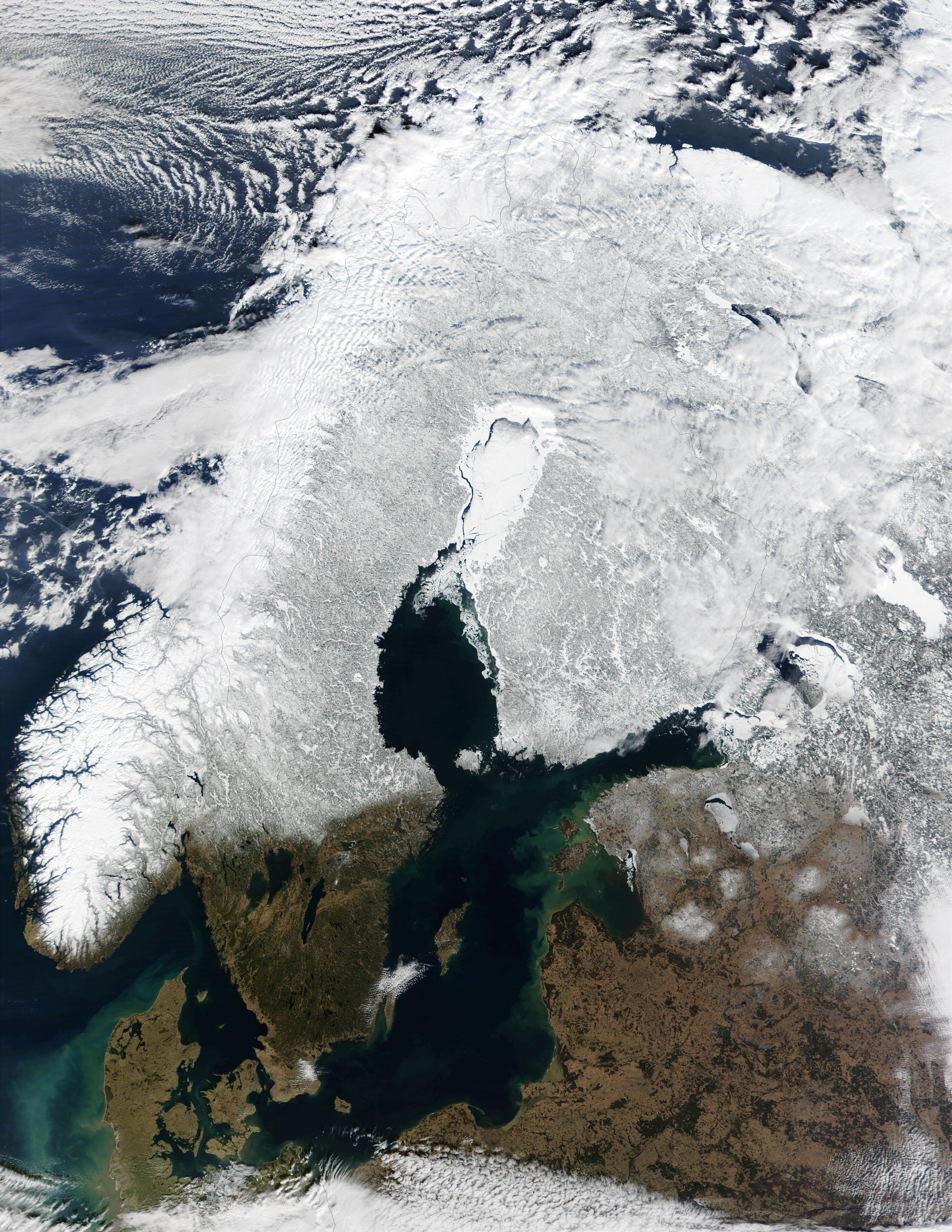
Satellite image of Fennoscandia in winter. The northern part of the Gulf of Bothnia, the Bothnian Bay, is covered with sea ice.

The Gulf of Bothnia (/ˈbɒθniə/; Swedish: Bottniska viken, Finnish and Meänkieli: Pohjanlahti) is an arm of the Baltic Sea lying between Sweden and Finland. It is divided into the Bothnian Sea and the more northerly Bothnian Bay, the two being separated by the Kvarken strait. At its mouth are the Åland Islands.

== Name ==
The name Bothnia is a latinization of the Swedish Botten, meaning "bay" in this context. This name was applied both to the gulf and to the regions adjoining it, as seen in the names of Österbotten, Västerbotten, and Norrbotten. The gulf is known in modern Swedish as Bottniska viken, while its northern and southern reaches are known as Bottenviken and Bottenhavet respectively. The Finnish name is Pohjanlahti, meaning "north inlet".

== Geography ==
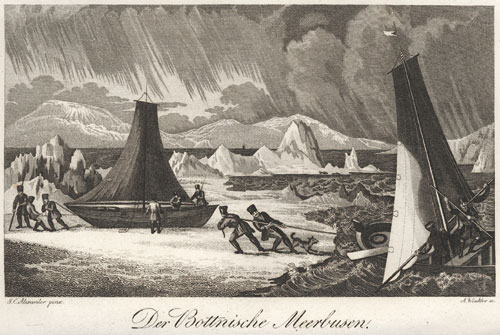
Depiction of the gulf, circa 1830

The International Hydrographic Organization defines the southern limit of the Gulf of Bothnia as follows:

From Simpnäsklubb (59°54'N) in Sweden, to Flötjan, Lagskær [sic], Fæstörne [sic], Kökarsörn, and Vænö-Kalkskær [sic] to the SW point of Hangöudde (Hangö Head, 59°49'N) in Finland, thus including Åland and adjacent shoals and channels in the Gulf of Bothnia.

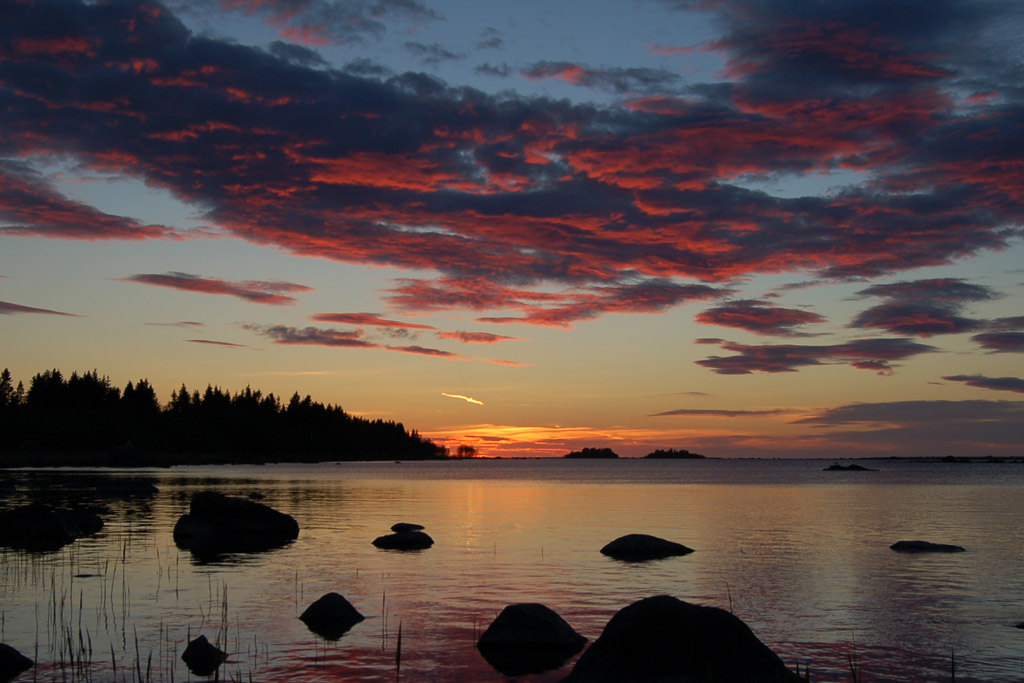
June 2006 view of the Gulf of Bothnia in Finland.

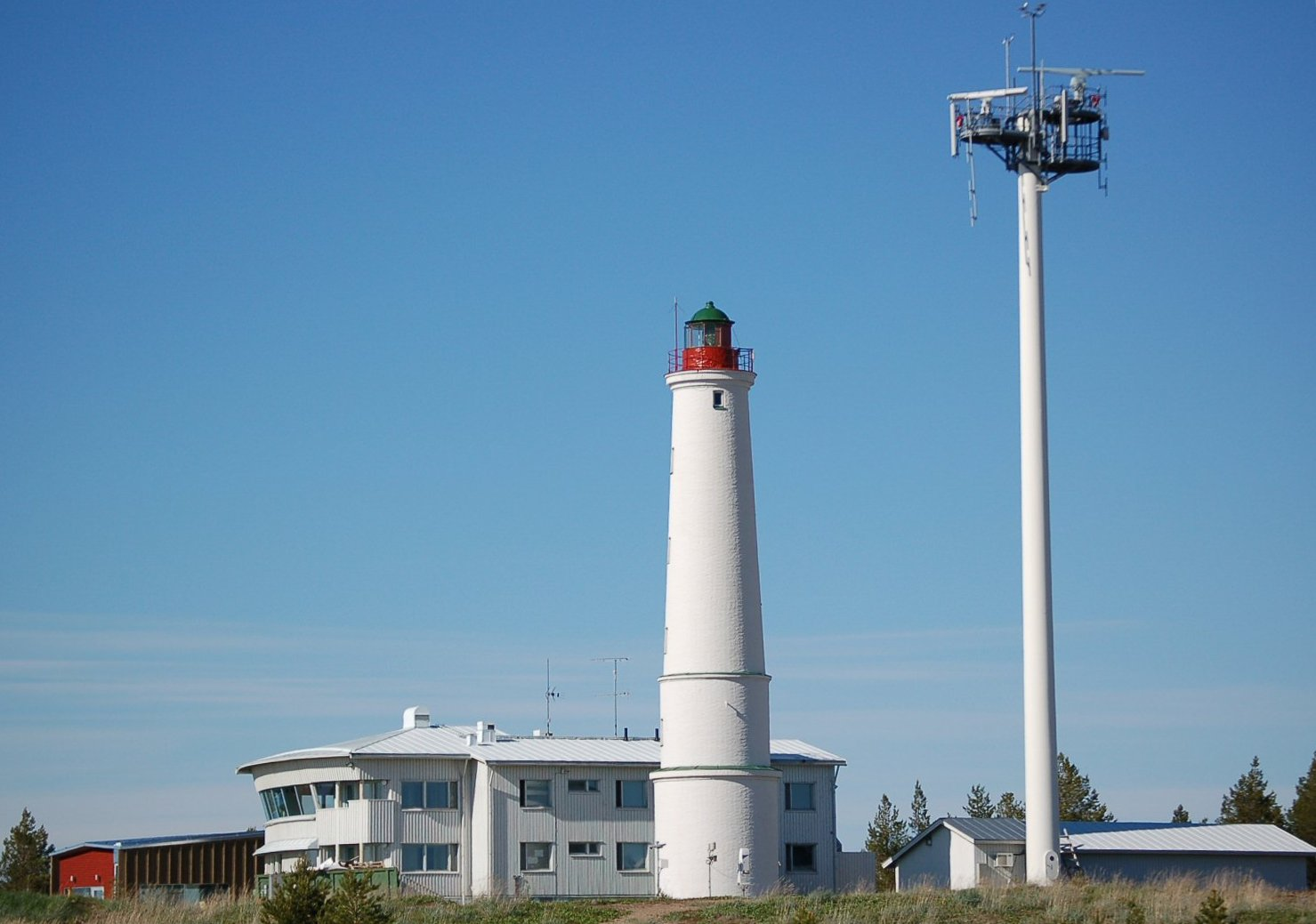
Pilot station and lighthouse in the Hailuoto Island, a municipality island at the Bothnian Bay near the city of Oulu

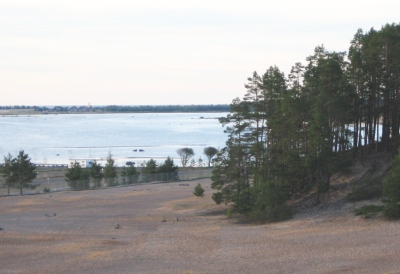
Sandy beaches of Kalajoki at the shores of the Gulf of Bothnia

The gulf is 725 km (450 mi) long, 80–240 km (50–149 mi) wide and has an average depth of 60 m (200 ft; 33 fathoms). The maximum depth is 295 m (968 ft; 161 fathoms). The surface area is 117,000 km^{2} (45,000 sq mi). The northernmost point is situated in Töre in the Bothnian Bay. its coordinates are 65° 54'07" N 22° 39'00 E.

The depth and surface area of the Gulf of Bothnia are constantly decreasing, as the land is rising after it had been pressed down by about 2,600 to 3,300 feet (790 to 1,010 meters) by the continental ice during last ice age. The rise is 80 cm every hundred years. It is estimated that the land has a further 300 to 400 feet (91 to 122 meters) to rise before equilibrium is reached. This recovery rate will progressively slow as isostatic equilibrium is approached.

Into the gulf flow a number of rivers from both sides; consequently, a salinity gradient exists from north to south. In the south the water is the normal brackish water of the Baltic Sea, but in the north, in the Bothnian Bay, the salinity is so low, from 0.4% near Kvarken to 0.2% in the northernmost part, that many freshwater fish such as the pike, whitefish and perch thrive in it.

The gulf is a combination of the Bothnian Bay in the north and the Bothnian Sea in the south, separated by the Kvarken region with a water depth of around 25 metres (82 ft) and a rate of land rising of almost 10 mm (0.39 inches) a year. Within 2000 years the bay is expected to separate from the rest of the gulf and become a freshwater lake.

Being nearly fresh, the gulf is frozen over five months every year. The icing of the Baltic Sea begins and ends in the northern Gulf of Bothnia. Traffic restrictions for icebreaker assistance are typically in force for all the gulf from late January to late April and for the northernmost ports from the middle of December to the middle of May.

== Geology ==
Geologically the Gulf of Bothnia is an ancient depression of tectonic origin. The depression is partly filled with sedimentary rock deposited in the Precambrian and Paleozoic. Nearby plains adjoining the gulf are part of the Sub-Cambrian peneplain. While being repeatedly covered by glaciers during the last 2.5 million years glacial erosion has had a limited effect in changing the topography.

It is estimated that within about 2,000 years, ongoing post-glacial rebound will raise the seafloor in the Norra Kvarken area above water, splitting the Gulf of Bothnia into a southern gulf and northern lake.

== History ==
The gulf was not known by ancient and medieval geographers and as late as in 1427 not indicated by the Danish cartographer Claudius Clavus, not even in the map of Hartmann Schedel, printed in 1493. The first map in which the gulf has been delineated, although without name, is that of Nicolaus Germanus from the year 1482.

== Economy ==
The land surrounding the Gulf of Bothnia is heavily forested. Trees are logged, then transported to the coast for milling. The gulf is also important for oil transport to the coastal cities and ore transport to steel mills, for instance in Raahe.

In terms of tonnage in international traffic, the largest ports on the Finnish side are Rauma, Kokkola and Tornio. The main ports of the Swedish side are in Luleå, Skellefteå, Umeå, Sundsvall, Gävle and Hargshamn. In Luleå, iron ore pellets are exported and coal is imported. Gävle is Sweden's third-largest container port. It also ships forest products and oil. The only regular cruiseferry route across the Gulf of Bothnia is the Wasaline service between Umeå and Vaasa.

In port operations in the Gulf of Bothnia, icebreaker assistance can be required for an ice season that averages as long as six months; whereas in the Gulf of Finland, the icebreaking season averages only three months.

There is some fishery, mainly Baltic herring, for domestic needs. A persistent problem has been pollution, because the sea is enclosed by a large drainage basin and is poorly connected to fresher waters from the Atlantic. Mercury and PCB levels have been relatively high, although the Finnish Food Safety Authority considers the herring edible. Although the levels exceed the limits, the fatty acids have health benefits that offset this risk.

== Rivers ==
- Kalajoki
- Kemijoki
- Kiiminkijoki
- Kokemäenjoki
- Oulujoki
- Dalälven
- Ljusnan
- Ljungan
- Indalsälven
- Ångerman
- Ume River
- Skellefte River
- Pite River
- Lule River
- Kalix River
- Torne

== Cities and towns ==
- Gävle
- Härnösand
- Jakobstad
- Kalajoki
- Kokkola
- Kristinestad
- Luleå
- Oulu
- Pori
- Rauma
- Sundsvall
- Umeå
- Vaasa
