= Helsinki Lighthouse =

Helsinki lighthouse Helsinki
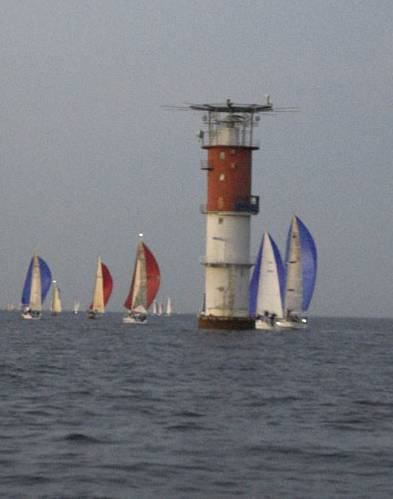
- Helsinki Lighthouse in 2007
- Location: Gulf of Finland, Baltic Sea
- Coordinates: 59.935833°N 24.918333°E

Tower
- Constructed: 1958; 67 years ago
- Height: 27.5 metres (90 ft) (above base structure)
- Shape: Cylindrical
- Markings: Red over white
- Power source: diesel generator
- Operator: Finnish Transport Infrastructure Agency
- Racon: T

Light
- First lit: 1959; 66 years ago
- Focal height: 25 metres (82 ft)
- Range: 22 kilometres (12 nmi)
- Characteristic: L.Fl W 12s

The Helsinki Lighthouse (Finnish: Helsingin majakka; also commonly known as Helsingin kasuuni — Swedish: Helsingfors fyra; Helsingfors kassun) is a caisson-type lighthouse located in the Gulf of Finland, 22 kilometres (12 nmi) due south of West Harbour, Helsinki.

Construction of the lighthouse began in the Suomenlinna shipyard in May 1958, and in August the same year the structure was towed to its current location and sank to rest on the seabed at a depth of 13 metres (43 ft). Further work was carried out the following year, and the lighthouse was officially commissioned in September 1959.

Constructed of reinforced concrete, the maximum diameter at the bottom of the submerged base is 19 metres (62 ft), and that of the visible tower 6 metres (20 ft). The height of the visible part is 27.5 metres (90 ft), with the light at 25 metres (82 ft) above mean sea level.

The tower has eight storeys, with the solar-powered 40W halogen light source on the top, and control and technical rooms as well as operator accommodation below. In 1984, a helipad was added on top of the tower.

The lighthouse is automated, and operated from the control room on the Harmaja islet.

There is a Finnish Meteorological Institute weather station located at the lighthouse.

== See also ==
- Harmaja lighthouse and pilot station
