= Jussarö Lighthouse =

Lighthouse in Finland

Jussarö Lighthouse (a.k.a. Sundharu Lighthouse)
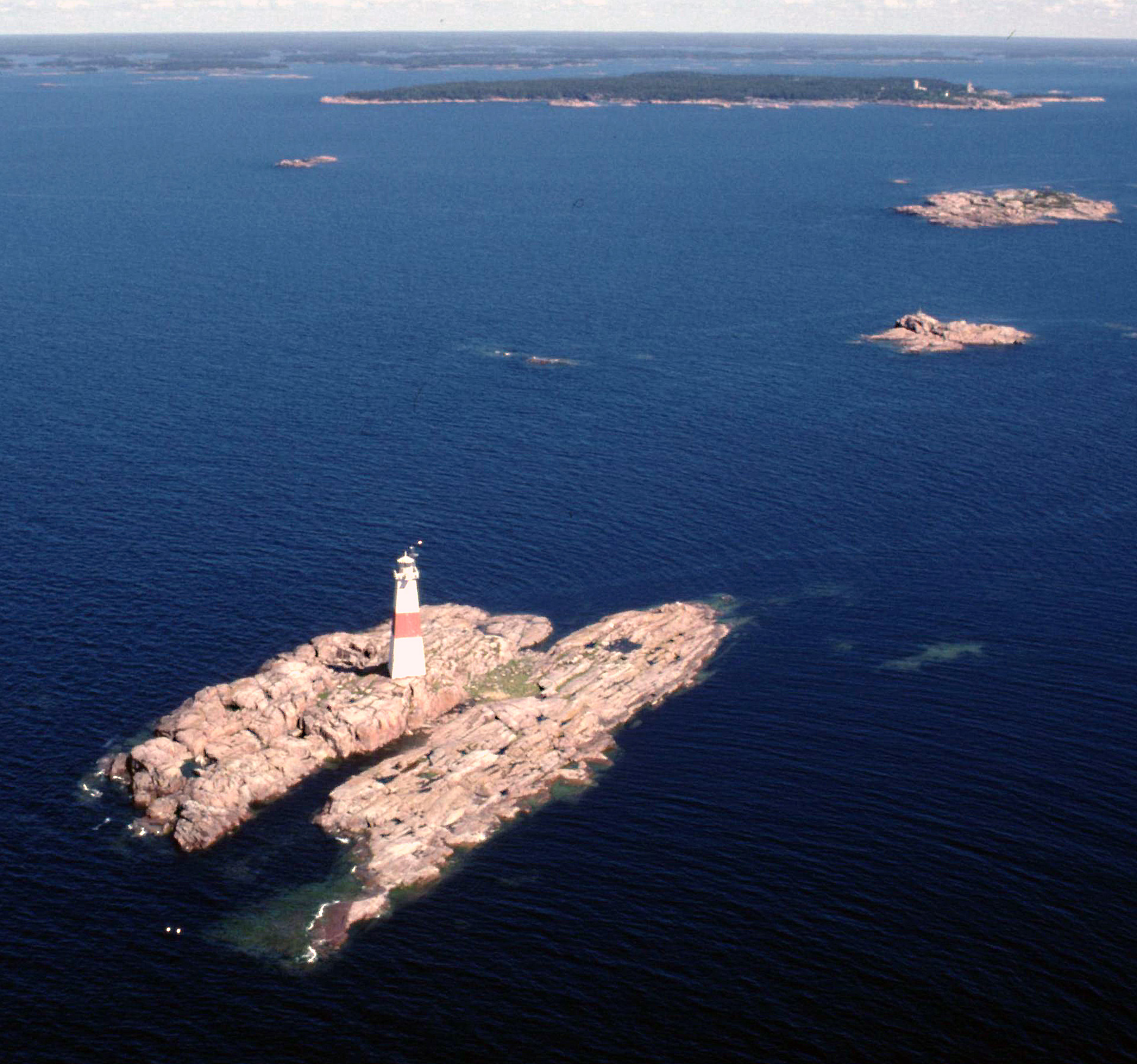
- Jussarö lighthouse on Sundharu skerry, with the island of Jussarö in the background
- Location: Gulf of Finland, Baltic Sea
- Coordinates: 59.826667°N 23.568333°E

Tower
- Constructed: 1922
- Construction: Reinforced concrete
- Automated: 1922
- Height: 25 m (82 ft)
- Markings: White, with red stripe
- Power source: acetylene, wind turbine

Light
- First lit: 20 November 1922
- Focal height: 31.3 m (103 ft)
- Range: 12 nmi (22 km; 14 mi)
- Characteristic: Fl W 12s (1996–)

Jussarö Lighthouse (Swedish: Jussarö fyr, Finnish: Jussarön majakka or Jussaaren majakka) is a lighthouse situated on the skerry of Sundharu, approximately 4 kilometres (2.2 nmi) south of the island of Jussarö, outside Raseborg, in the western part of the Gulf of Finland. The lighthouse is more correctly called the Sundharu Lighthouse, to distinguish it from an earlier one located on Jussarö itself, which the current structure replaced.

The first illuminated lighthouse in the area was built on Jussarö in the late 1880s, along with the accommodation and service buildings for the lighthouse keepers and pilots and their families. This lighthouse was lit in 1891. There were, however, structural and technical problems with its operation, for which reason a new lighthouse was built on the uninhabited Sundharu skerry to the south of Jussarö, and lit in 1922, when the old light was deactivated.

The new Sundharu Lighthouse was the first in Finland designed to be automatically operated from the outset. The light source was gas (acetylene), with a tank large enough to only need refilling once a month. In 1984, the gas-lit source was replaced with one powered by a wind generator, and a solar panel was added in 1999.
