= Marjaniemi Lighthouse =

Marjaniemi lighthouse Marjaniemi
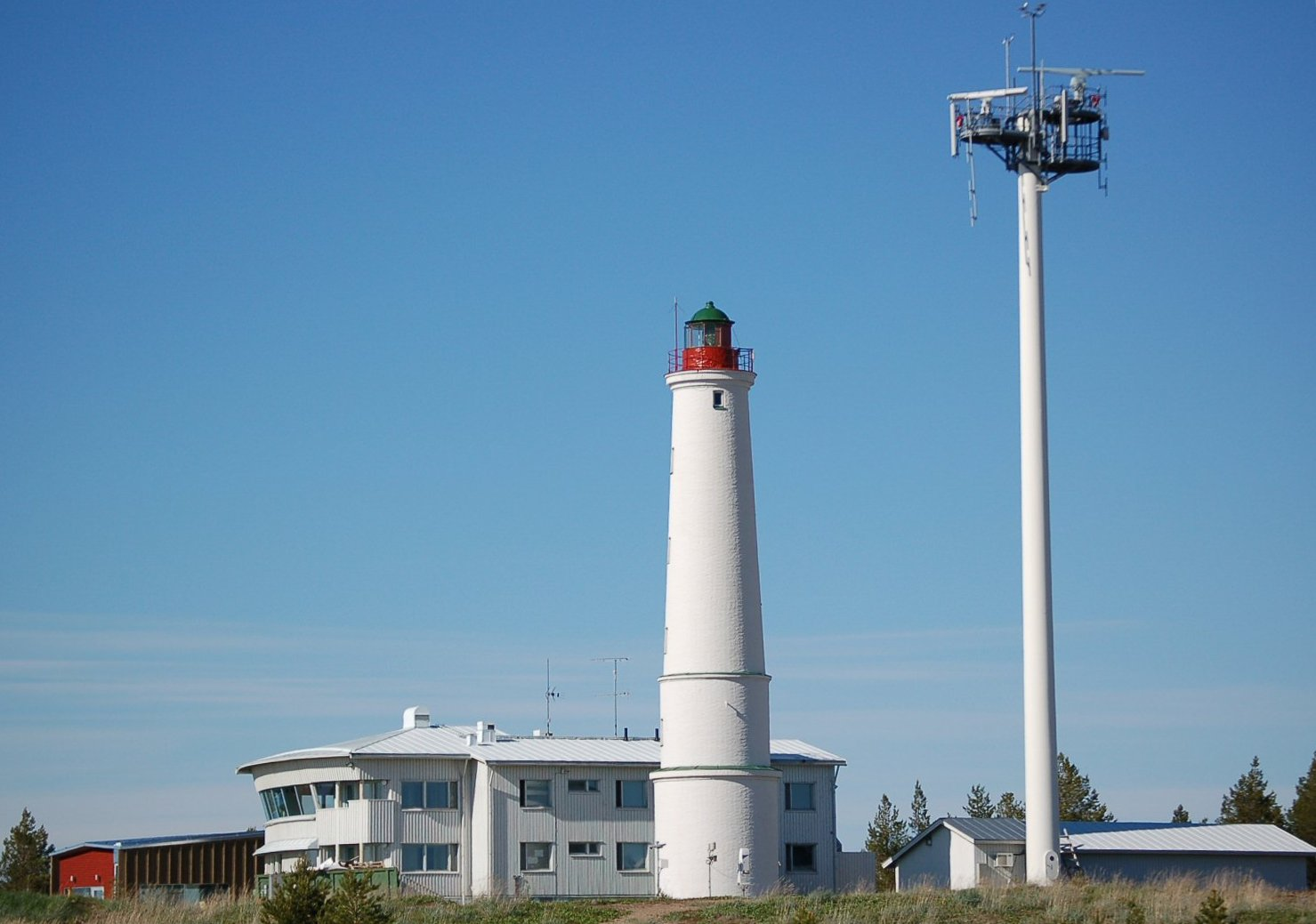
- Marjaniemi Lighthouse and Pilot Station
- Location: Marjaniemi, Hailuoto, Finland
- Coordinates: 65°02′24.4″N 24°33′41.5″E

Tower
- Constructed: 1871
- Construction: masonry tower
- Automated: 1962
- Height: 25.0 m (82.0 ft)
- Shape: cylindrical, three-segment tower with balcony and lantern
- Markings: white tower, red lantern, green lantern dome
- Power source: rapeseed oil, kerosene, acetylene, electricity
- Heritage: protected building in the Built Heritage Register

Light
- First lit: 1872
- Focal height: 30.2 m (99 ft)
- Lens: Fresnel lens
- Range: 19 NM (35 km; 22 mi)
- Characteristic: Fl (2) W 20s.

Marjaniemi Lighthouse (Finnish: Marjaniemen majakka) is a lighthouse located in the village of Marjaniemi at the westernmost point of Hailuoto island on the Gulf of Bothnia. The lighthouse is located approximately 50 kilometres (31 mi) west of Oulu. The lighthouse was designed by Axel Hampus Dalström as his fourth lighthouse and it was first lit in 1872.

The tower is brick masonry, and has 110 steps inside with no intermediate floors. Originally the light was equipped with a Fresnel lens system, and it displayed a white light towards a sector clockwise from south to northeast. There were two lighthouse keepers and a master until 1962 when the lighthouse was automated. A pilot station was built next to the tower, currently the pilot station serves as a hotel.

The lighthouse also houses a smaller sector light that is used to guide vessels to and from the fishing harbour. Today the lighthouse also houses a webcam.

== Climate ==
Climate data for Hailuoto Marjaniemi (1991–2020 normals, extremes 1995– present)
| Month | Jan | Feb | Mar | Apr | May | Jun | Jul | Aug | Sep | Oct | Nov | Dec | Year |
|---|---|---|---|---|---|---|---|---|---|---|---|---|---|
| Record high °C (°F) | 4.5 (40.1) | 4.8 (40.6) | 10.8 (51.4) | 18.3 (64.9) | 28.4 (83.1) | 30.2 (86.4) | 31.8 (89.2) | 30.6 (87.1) | 24.2 (75.6) | 15.4 (59.7) | 9.9 (49.8) | 6.7 (44.1) | 31.8 (89.2) |
| Daily mean °C (°F) | −6.8 (19.8) | −7.9 (17.8) | −4.8 (23.4) | 0.1 (32.2) | 5.9 (42.6) | 12.2 (54.0) | 16.2 (61.2) | 15.0 (59.0) | 10.4 (50.7) | 4.5 (40.1) | −0.2 (31.6) | −3.6 (25.5) | 3.4 (38.1) |
| Record low °C (°F) | −33.6 (−28.5) | −33.6 (−28.5) | −28.7 (−19.7) | −18.5 (−1.3) | −4.1 (24.6) | 1.6 (34.9) | 6.6 (43.9) | 5.6 (42.1) | −0.5 (31.1) | −8.7 (16.3) | −21.3 (−6.3) | −30.5 (−22.9) | −33.6 (−28.5) |
Source 1: FMI normals 1991-2020
Source 2: Record highs and lows 1995- present
