= Säppi Lighthouse =

Lighthouse in Finland

Säppi lighthouse Säppi
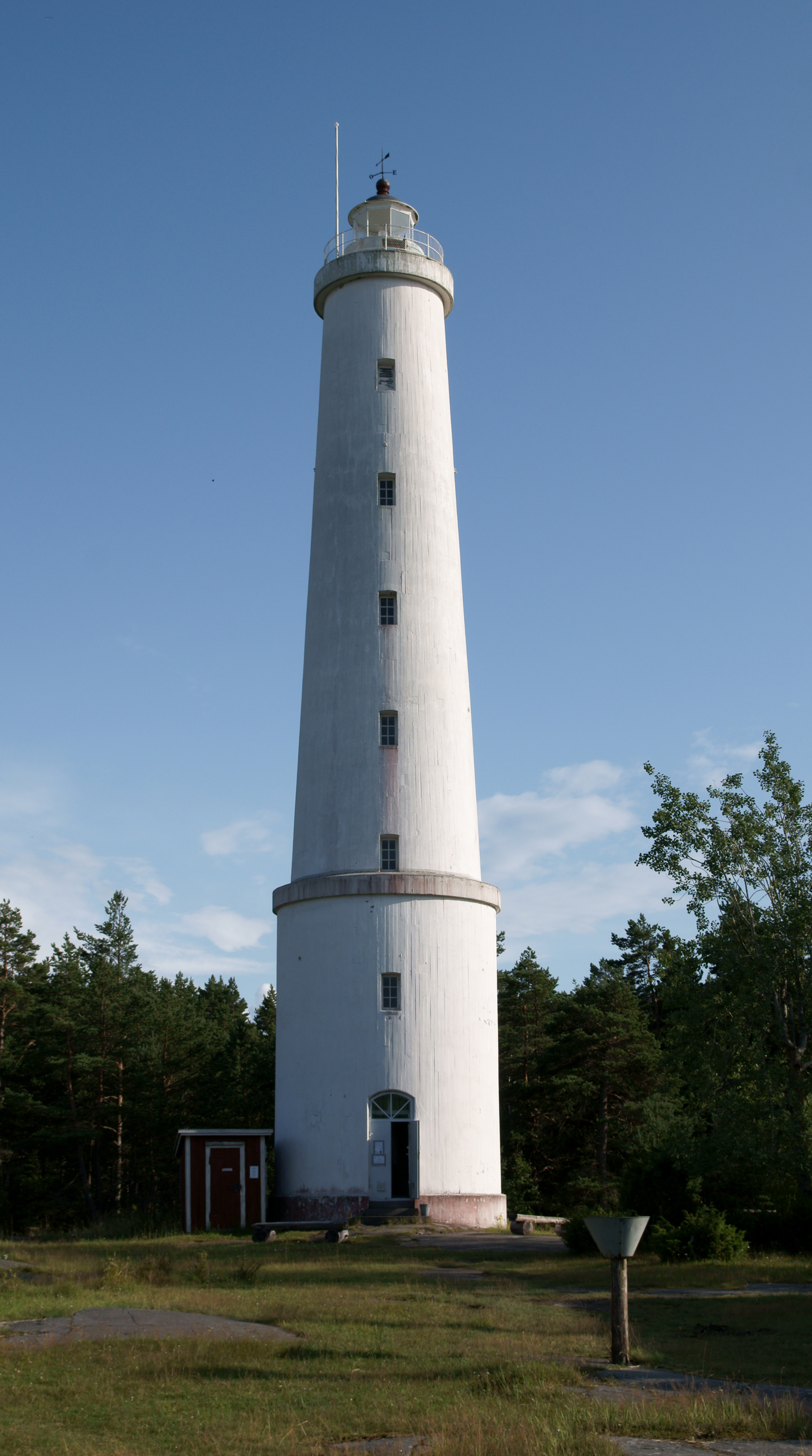
- Location: Eurajoki, Finland
- Coordinates: 61.477427°N 21.347738°E

Tower
- Constructed: 1873
- Construction: brick tower
- Automated: 1962
- Height: 28.21 metres (92.6 ft)
- Shape: two stage tapered cylindrical tower with balcony and lantern
- Markings: white tower, red lantern dome
- Heritage: Cultural Heritage Site of National Significance

Light
- Focal height: 34.8 metres (114 ft)
- Range: 11 nmi (20 km)
- Characteristic: Fl (2+1) W 30s.

Säppi Lighthouse (Finnish: Säpin majakka, Swedish: Sebbskärs fyr) is a lighthouse on the coast of Bothnian Sea, located in Eurajoki, in the island of Säppi. The lighthouse stands approximately 14 kilometers Southwest of the Port of Pori on the area of Eurajoki municipality. It was designed by Finnish architect Axel Hampus Dalström and first lit in 1873.

== History ==
The first wooden daymark in Säppi was built by the merchants of Pori in 1779. It was replaced by a hexagon-type daymark in 1852. Construction of the present lighthouse was launched in the spring of 1873 and it was lit in September. Säppi lighthouse was automated in 1962 and today it is powered by solar panels. The lighthouse was originally equipped with a Fresnel lens system.

Säppi Island has been a part of the Bothnian Sea National Park since 2011. Lighthouse and the surrounding buildings are inventoried by the Finnish National Board of Antiquities as one of Cultural heritage sites of national importance in Finland. The island is visited annually by some 4,000 tourists.
