= Harmaja =

Harmaja Lighthouse Harmajan majakka / Gråhara fyr
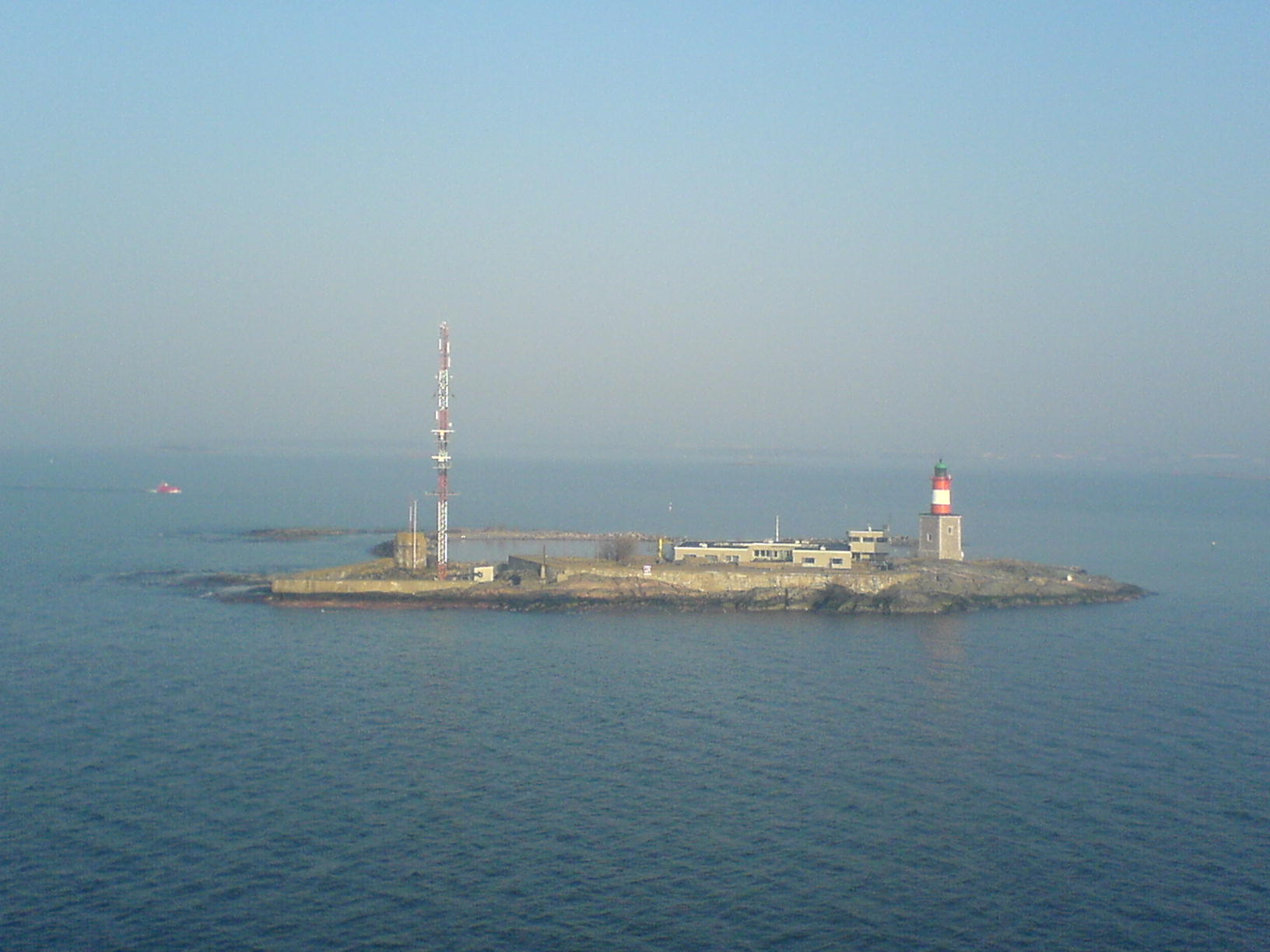
- Location: Helsinki, Finland
- Coordinates: 60.105043°N 24.975506°E

Tower
- Constructed: 1883 (first)
- Construction: stone basement, cast iron tower
- Height: 15 metres (49 ft)
- Shape: cylindrical tower with balcony and lantern on a square basement
- Markings: red tower with a horizontal white band, green lantern dome, unpainted basement

Light
- First lit: 1900 (tower raised)
- Focal height: 24 metres (79 ft)
- Range: 14.9 nmi (27.6 km; 17.1 mi)
- Characteristic: Oc WRG 6s

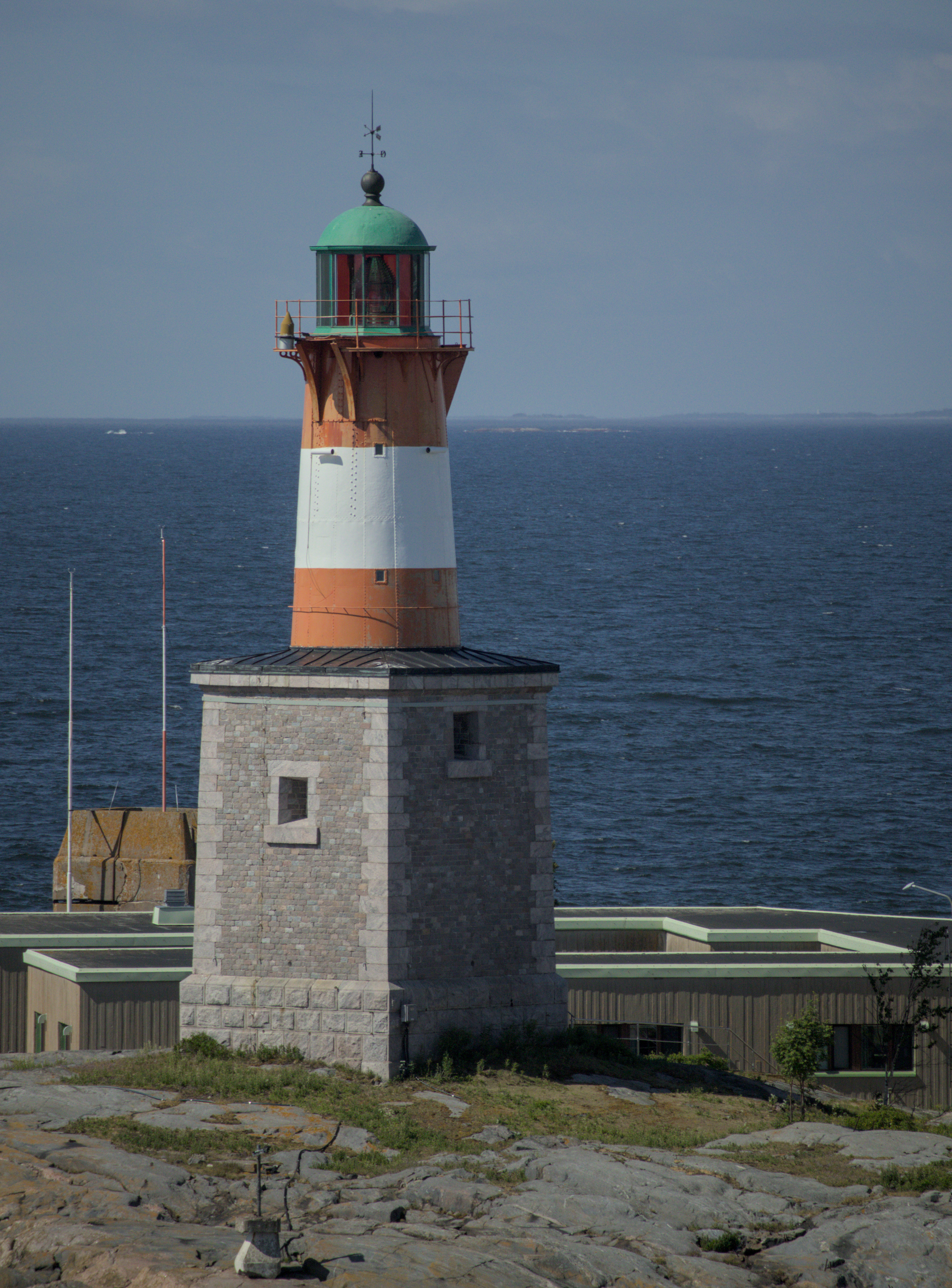
The lighthouse pictured in 2024

Harmaja (Swedish: Gråhara) is an island and a lighthouse outside Helsinki, south of the Suomenlinna sea fortress. The island has been functioning as a landmark since the 16th century. A landmark structure was built on the island in the 18th century and a light house in 1883. The first lighthouse was only 7.3 m high and it soon proved to be too low. In 1900 the height was doubled by creating a rectangular brick building on a granite base. A large foghorn alerted ships in fog and in bad visibility. Harmaja received the world's first directed and undirected radio beacon in 1936. The lighthouse is fully automated today.

There is also a pilot station on the island.

During the 1952 Summer Olympics this was the center of the Olympic sailing event.

== Climate ==
Climate data for Helsinki Harmaja 1991–2020 normals, records 1993–present
Month	Jan	Feb	Mar	Apr	May	Jun	Jul	Aug	Sep	Oct	Nov	Dec	Year
Record high °C (°F)	7.6 (45.7)	7.5 (45.5)	11.2 (52.2)	16.1 (61.0)	24.7 (76.5)	27.4 (81.3)	29.3 (84.7)	27.0 (80.6)	21.9 (71.4)	16.0 (60.8)	13.0 (55.4)	8.7 (47.7)	29.3 (84.7)
Mean daily maximum °C (°F)	−0.7 (30.7)	−1.6 (29.1)	0.9 (33.6)	5.4 (41.7)	11.1 (52.0)	15.7 (60.3)	19.2 (66.6)	18.9 (66.0)	14.6 (58.3)	9.1 (48.4)	4.7 (40.5)	1.7 (35.1)	8.3 (46.9)
Daily mean °C (°F)	−2.5 (27.5)	−3.5 (25.7)	−1.0 (30.2)	2.8 (37.0)	8.2 (46.8)	13.1 (55.6)	16.8 (62.2)	16.6 (61.9)	12.6 (54.7)	7.3 (45.1)	3.1 (37.6)	0.1 (32.2)	6.1 (43.0)
Mean daily minimum °C (°F)	−4.7 (23.5)	−5.8 (21.6)	−3.2 (26.2)	1.1 (34.0)	6.2 (43.2)	11.2 (52.2)	14.8 (58.6)	14.8 (58.6)	10.9 (51.6)	5.9 (42.6)	1.5 (34.7)	−1.9 (28.6)	4.2 (39.6)
Record low °C (°F)	−24.7 (−12.5)	−24.3 (−11.7)	−16.4 (2.5)	−9.9 (14.2)	−1.1 (30.0)	3.4 (38.1)	7.6 (45.7)	7.9 (46.2)	2.1 (35.8)	−5.7 (21.7)	−13.0 (8.6)	−20.5 (−4.9)	−24.7 (−12.5)
Average relative humidity (%)	90	89	85	83	80	83	84	83	83	85	88	89	85
Source: https://www.ilmatieteenlaitos.fi/ilmastollinen-vertailukausi https://kilotavu.com/asema-taulukko.php?asema=100996

== See also ==
- Helsinki Lighthouse
