= Relandersgrund =

Finnish lightvessel

Coordinates: 60°10′9.96″N 24°57′32.24″E

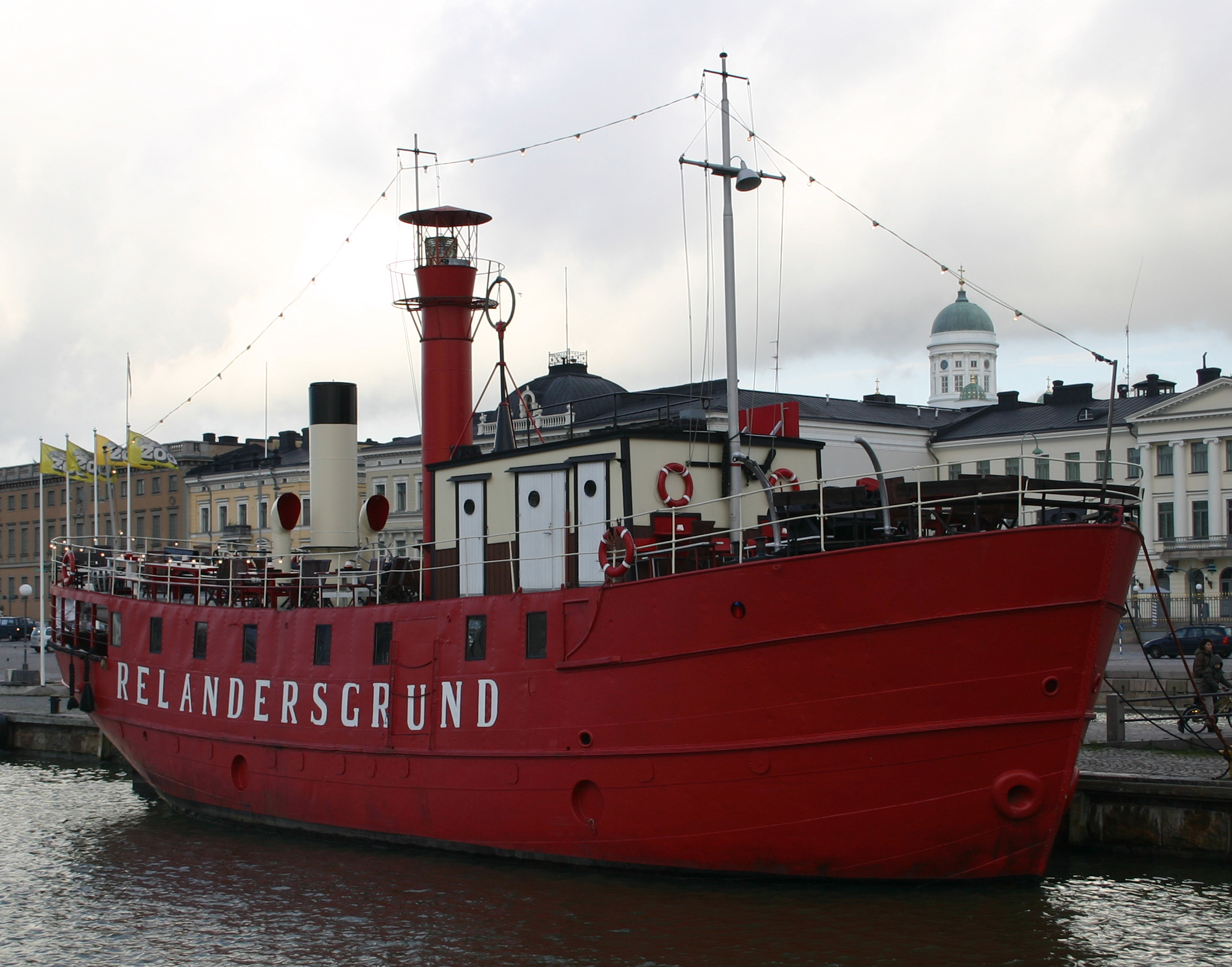
- Relandersgrund at the Herring Market

History

Finland
- Name: Relandersgrund
- Owner: Finnish Maritime Administration
- Builder: W:m Crichton & C:o, Turku, Grand Duchy of Finland
- Launched: 1888
- Home port: Helsinki, Finland

General characteristics
- Type: Lightvessel
- Displacement: 168 tonnes
- Length: 27.1 metres
- Beam: 6.7 metres

Relandersgrund is a former lightvessel formerly located at the Relanderinmatala shallow in Rauma, Finland.

== Structure and equipment ==
The ship was built from 1886 to 1888 in Turku at the W:m Crichton & C:o shipyard. The ship's hull is made of steel and fastened with bolts. The ship's measurements are 27.1 by 6.7 by 2.1 metres (88.9 ft × 22.0 ft × 6.9 ft). The ship has a displacement of 168 tonnes. The ship originally had two masts and sails, a light emission device running on oil and a fog siren running on pressurised air. At the turn of the century the ship was fitted with a boiler for the foghorn, the anchor and heating. The hot-bulb engine operating the foghorn was moved to use an electric generator which powered a searchlight. This device, using an arc lamp rare at the time, was used for maritime pilots. All other lamps on the ship were kerosene lamps.

The ship was unpowered and moved pulled by a tugboat. The sails were usually only raised to lighten the burden on the anchor chain during harsh weather at sea.

== As a lightvessel ==
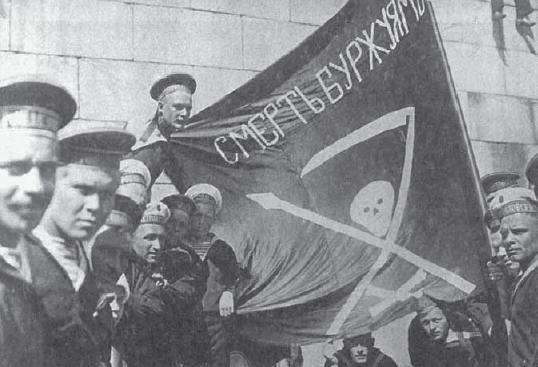
Revolutionary Russian seamen with their skull insignia. The flag says Death to the bourgeoisie! in Russian.

The ship replaced its wooden, badly deteriorated predecessor Quarken. It was named after its location at the Relanderinmatala shallow. The ship spent almost three decades at its post. In wintertime, the ship was usually tugged to Rauma or to Turku for docking.

=== Hijacking and sinking ===
In 1918, the ship was spending the winter in Turku awaiting docking. Because of the ongoing war, it had not been towed into its post in summertime for the previous couple of years. In Turku, revolutionary Russian seamen hijacked the ship and towed it to the south coast of Finland. When the ship was met with ice hazards too dangerous to navigate past the Russians decided to abandon and sink the ship.

After the war had ended, the Finns surfaced the ship and sent it to Tallinn, Estonia for repairs. However, the ship was so badly deteriorated it could only be used as a deputy lightvessel. The Finns had received a new and better steam-powered lightvessel from Liepāja, Latvia, which became the new lightvessel Helsinki.

=== As a deputy lightvessel ===
The old lightvessel was renamed Reserv I and acted as a deputy ship for lightvessels while they were docked. The ship also served as a replacement for the first lightvessel Storbrotten after it had been destroyed by a mine until the ship's successor was completed.

In 1930 the ship was renamed Varamajakka 1 as a Finnish translation of its Swedish name.

== As a base ship for sea survey ==
In 1937, the ship was stripped of its light emission equipment and moved to the second sea survey expedition for a residential and design ship. The ship was first designated MKH 3, but the expedition named it Vuolle, which soon became its official name. The ship's Italian red hulls were repainted white to match the other sea surveying ships. The ship was well suited for sea survey: it was stable, easy to tug and suitably sized and shallow enough to pass through the old locks at the northern end of Lake Saimaa. As Vuolle the ship spent exactly 40 years as a base ship for sea survey.

The ship's previous name Varamajakka 1 was passed on to the former lightvessel Helsingkallan now serving as a deputy ship.

== In private use ==
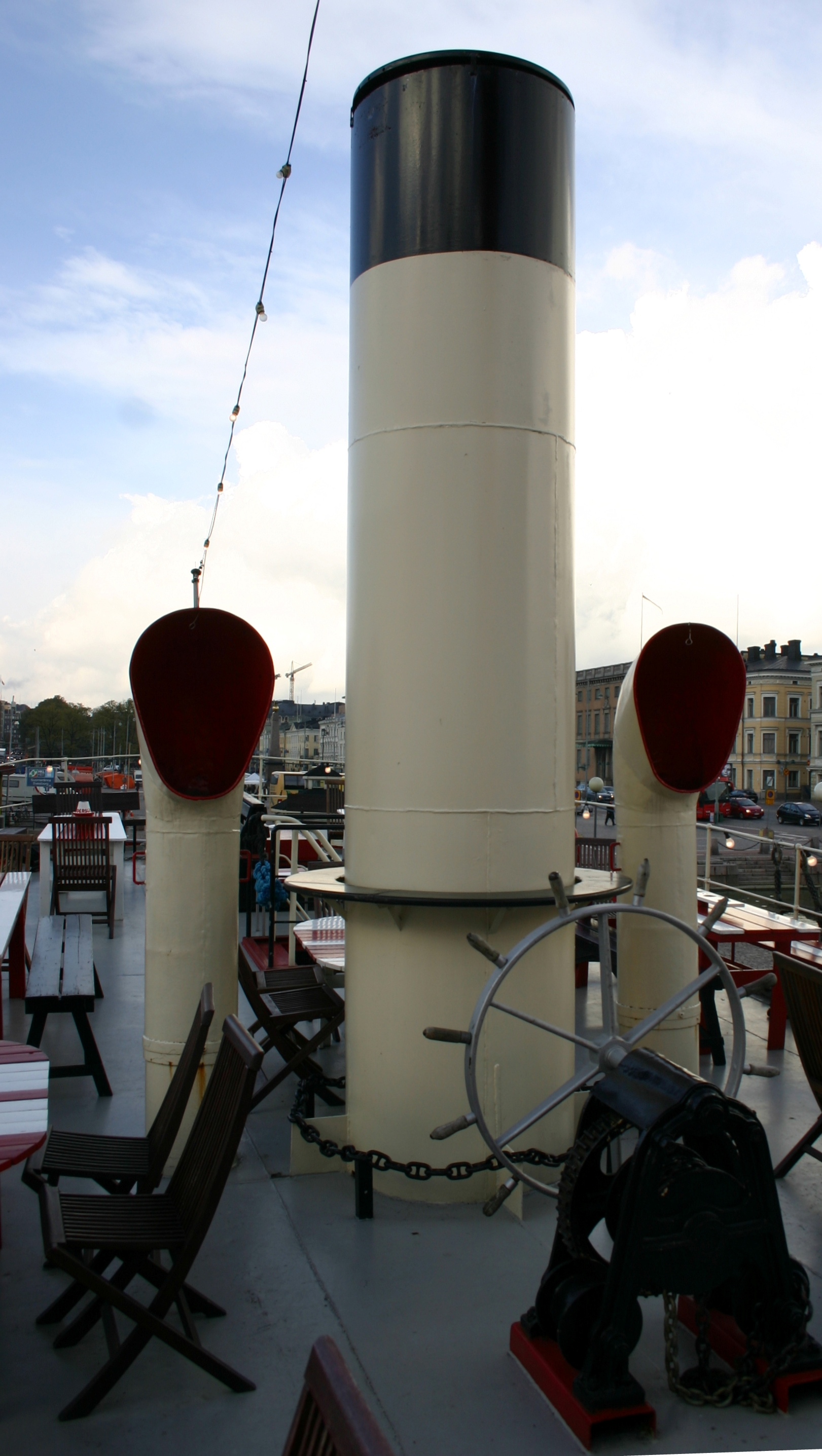
The chimney and wheel of Relandersgrund.

In 1978 the ship was sold to a junkyard, which decided to renovate the ship as a maritime summer villa instead of scrapping it. The deck was fitted with pitched-roofed deck structures.

In the late 1980s the ship ended up at a junkyard at Koirakari in Hamina. In 1991 the ship was saved from scrapping and was sold to Kotka. It was docked at the Meretehas docks in Tallinn, otherwise it was repaired in private. The deck structures were repaired according to the lightvessel Kemi serving as a museum ship and repainted in their original colours. A freely designed copy of an electrical light tower was placed on the top of the deck. The wheel of the ship was moved from the front of the top deck to the middle in front of the exhaust pipe; it is no longer functional. The ship's rudder was installed to the centre of the ship during renovation; it has retained the possibility for hand steering with a separate handle.

The ship was renamed Relandersgrund after its original name.

The ship's heavy main anchor and secondary anchor, both including their chains, were moved to Kotka at the ship's anchoring site, as they were deemed too heavy to transport along with the ship. In 2012 they were moved to Helsinki to the ship's new permanent post.

Because of cost reasons, the ship was repainted signal red. The ship's chimney is the pipe of the boiler used to power the anchor winch, foghorn and heating of the ship during its service as a lightvessel, which acted as the pipe of the storage water heater during the ship's service as a residential ship. The storage water heater has since been removed.

The café and restaurant ship was moved from Kotka to Helsinki. In October 2005 the ship was towed to the Suomenlinna docks to spend the winter and undergo bottom repairs. In summer 2006 Relandersgrund was moved to its new post at the departure site of the old Korkeasaari zoo ferry at the Meritullintori coast opposite the Finnish Main Guard. The ship had undergone repairs at the Suomenlinna docks also during the winters 2006–2007 and 2007–2008. During the Herring Market the ship has been stationed at the Helsinki Market Square.

== Sources ==
- Auvinen, Visa: Leijonalippu merellä. Turku, Eita Oy 1983. ISBN 951-95781-1-0
- Laurell, Seppo: Aalloilla keinuvat majakat: historiikki majakkalaivojen aikakaudesta ja museoalus Kemistä. Finnish Maritime Administration, Helsinki 1988. ISBN 951-49-0940-2
- Laurell, Seppo: Suomen majakat. Kustannusosakeyhtiö Nemo, Helsinki 1999. ISBN 952-5180-21-2
