= Säppi =

Säppi Sebbskär
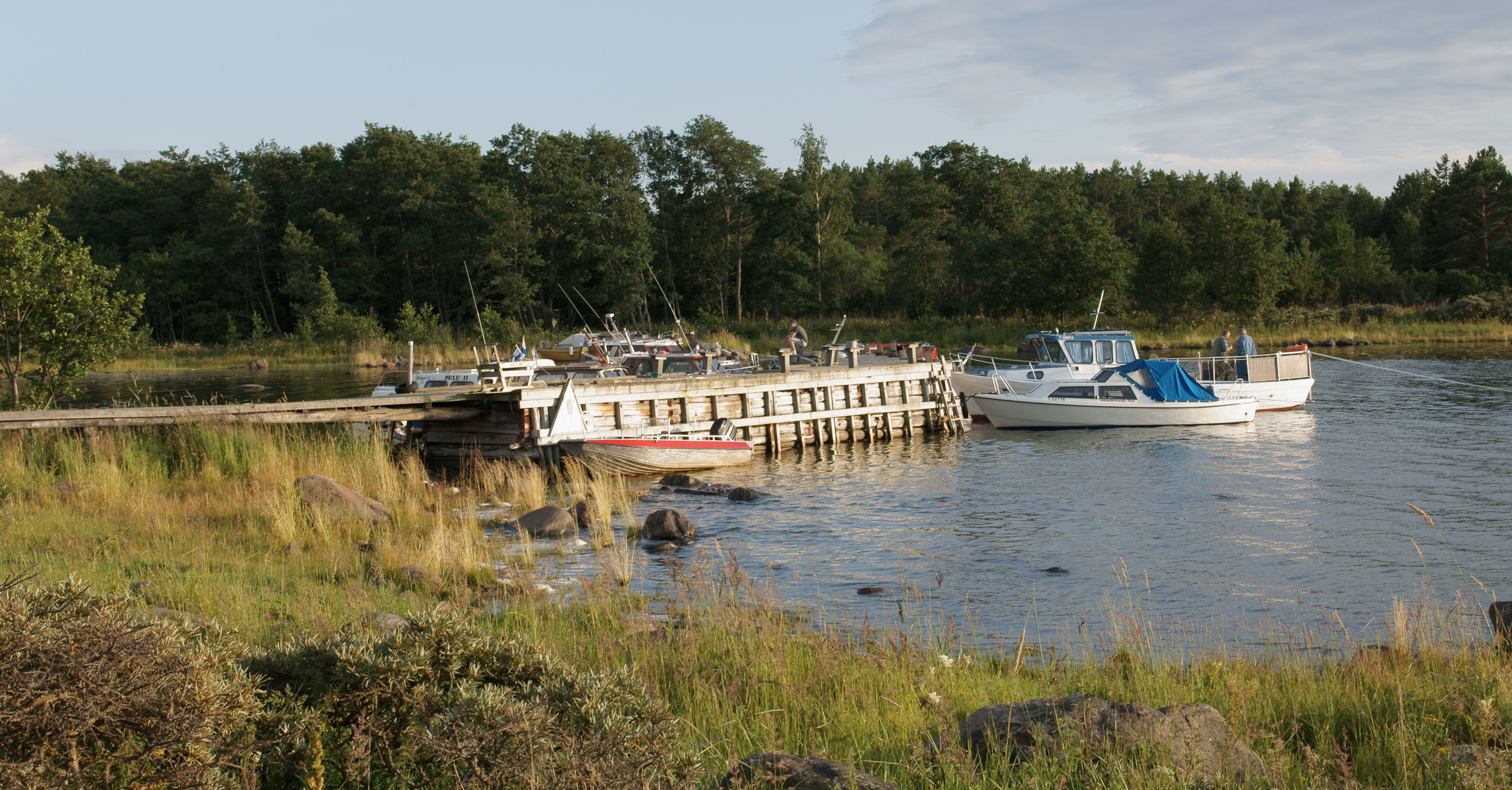
- Säppi Harbor
- Interactive map of Säppi; Sebbskär

Geography
- Coordinates: 61°28.6′N 021°21.1′E
- Area: 1.5 km^{2} (0.58 sq mi)
- Length: 1.3 km (0.81 mi)
- Width: 1.1 km (0.68 mi)
- Highest elevation: 8.0 m (26.2 ft)

Administration
- Finland
- Municipality: Eurajoki

Demographics
- Population: uninhabited

Säppi (Swedish: Sebbskär) is an island on the coast of Bothnian Sea in the municipality of Eurajoki in Finland. The island is located some 20 kilometres (12 miles) west of the city of Pori and 6.5 kilometres (4.0 miles) off the mainland.

Island of Säppi is best known of the 1873 built Säppi Lighthouse and its community which are inventoried by the Finnish National Board of Antiquities as one of Cultural heritage sites of national importance in Finland. Säppi has been a part of the Bothnian Sea National Park since 2011. Today the island is visited some 4,000 tourists annually.

Säppi is one of the seven Finnish islands with a wild mouflon population. They were introduced in 1949 by a group of local hunters. The Säppi sheep have given the name for a beer brand "Mufloni", bottled by a local brewery Beer Hunter's. From early spring to October the island hosts a herd of highland cattle used by Finnish forest administration for conservation grazing. Säppi is also popular among birdwatchers.

== Images ==
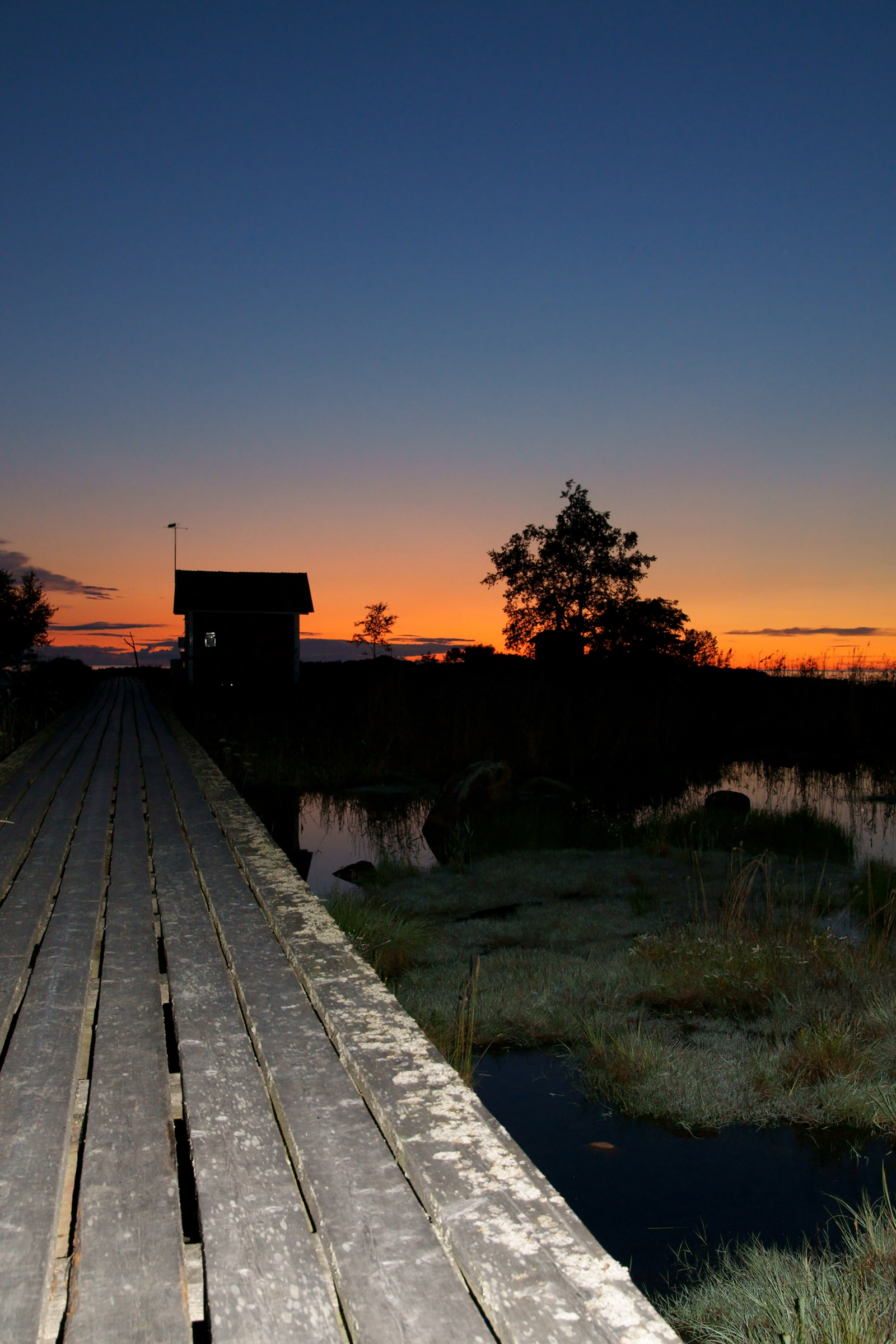
Sunset at Säppi Harbor

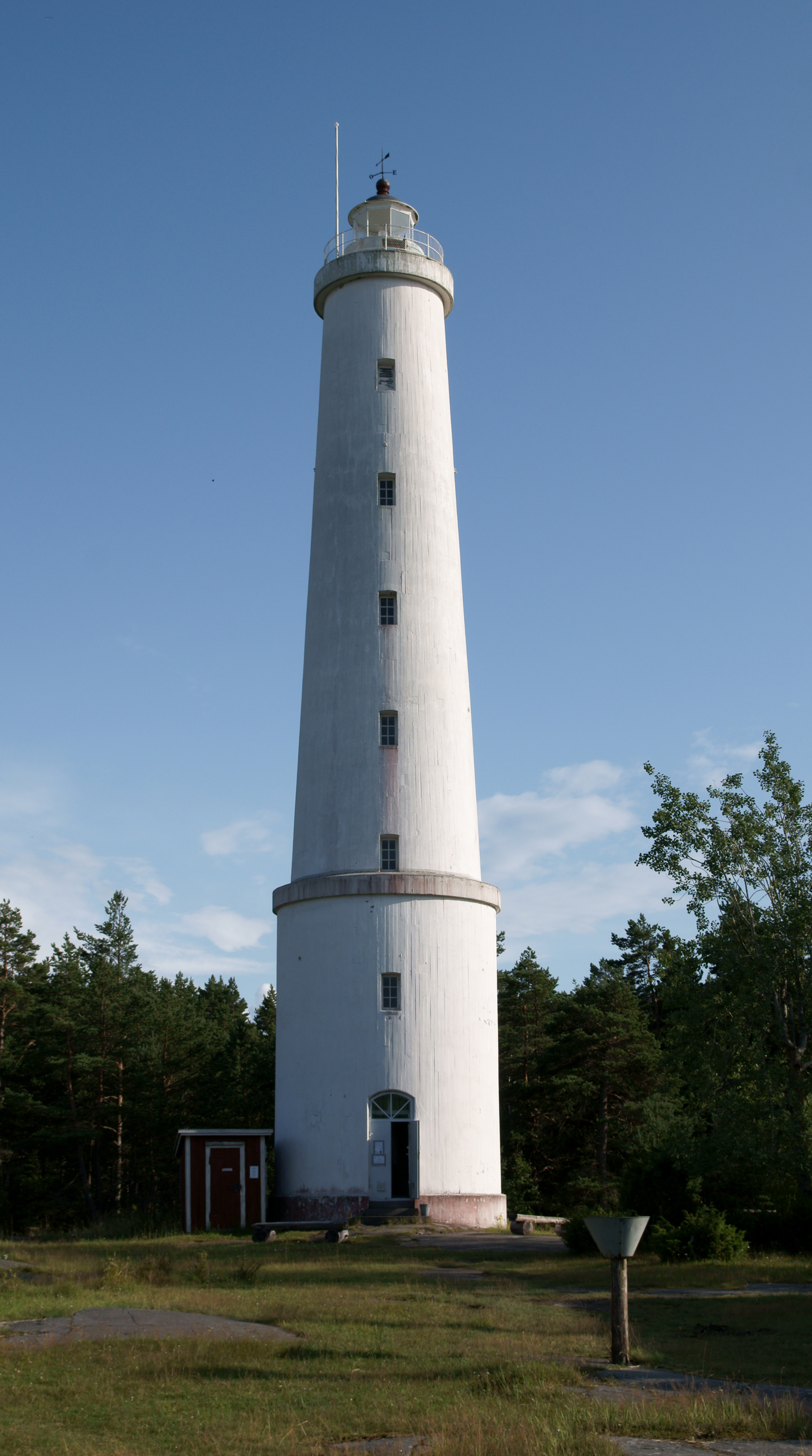
Säppi Lighthouse

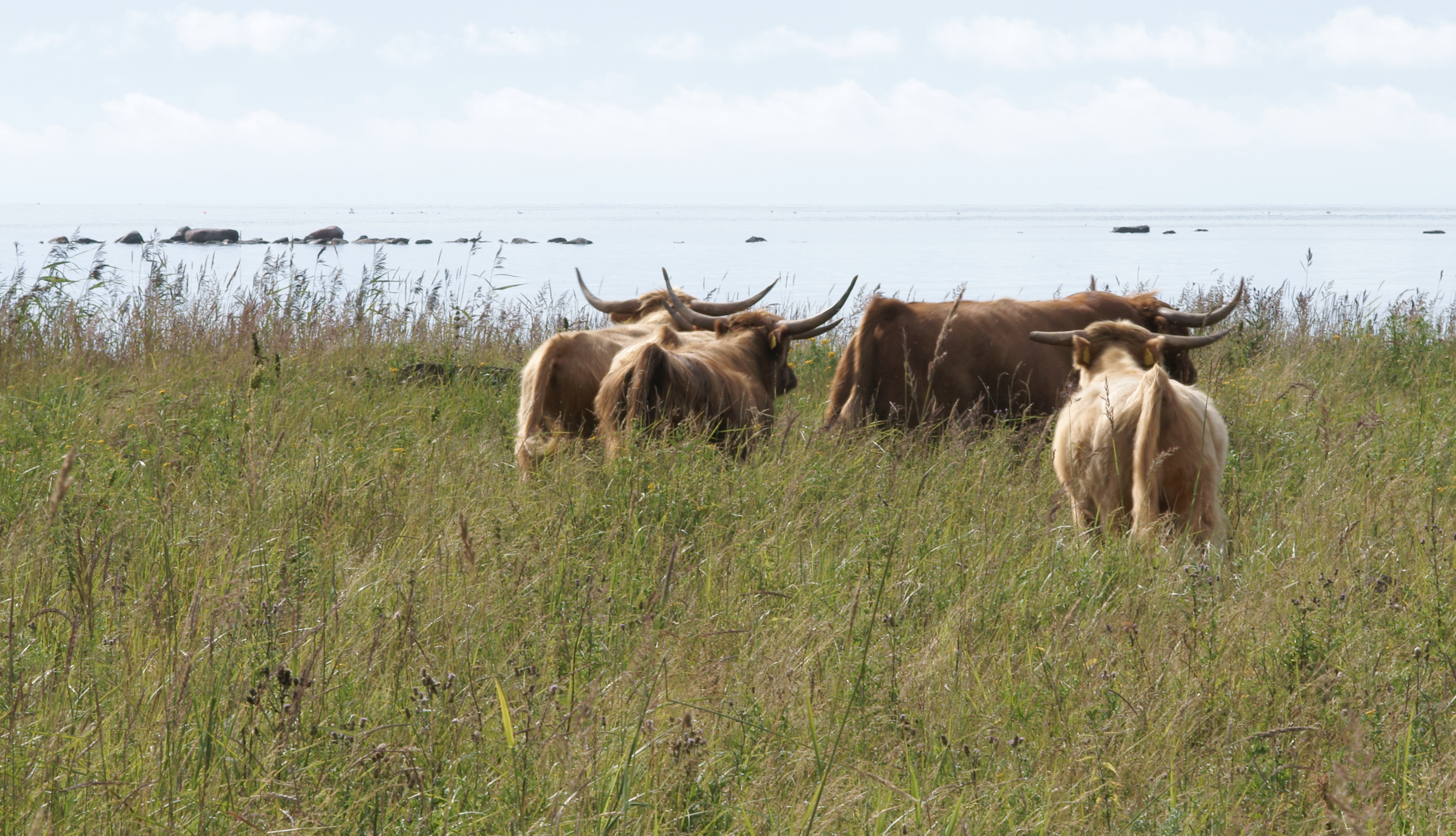
A herd of highland cattle
