= Rauma, Finland =

Town in Satakunta, Finland

Rauma Raumo
- City
- Rauman kaupunki Raumo stad
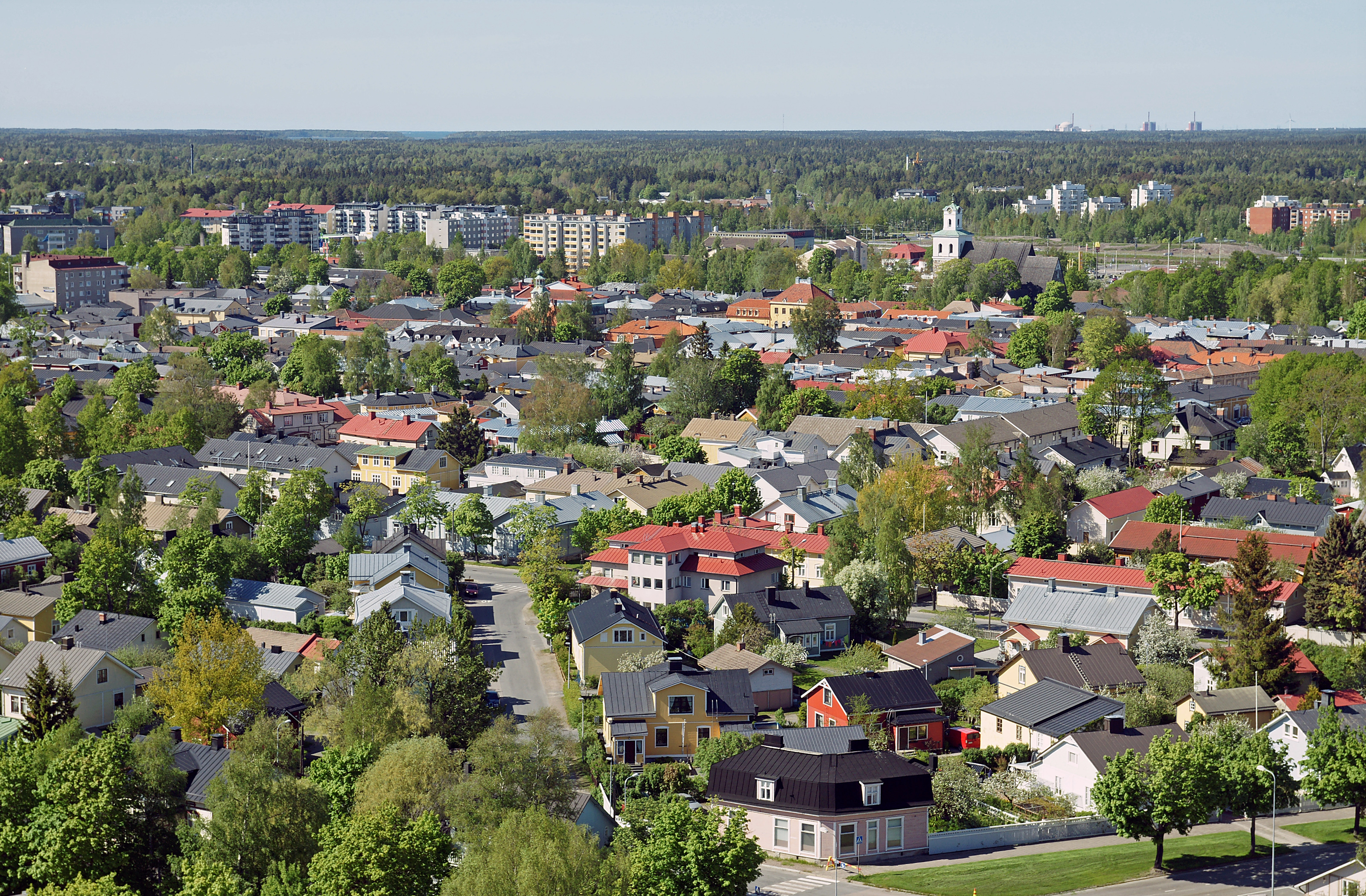
- Rauma in May 2012

- Flag Coat of arms

- Location of Rauma in Finland
- Interactive map of Rauma
- Coordinates: 61°08′N 021°30′E
- Country: Finland
- Region: Satakunta
- Sub-region: Rauma
- Charter: 1442-04-17

Government
  - Town manager: Esko Poikela

Area (2018-01-01)
  - Total: 1,110.12 km^{2} (428.62 sq mi)
  - Land: 496.43 km^{2} (191.67 sq mi)
  - Water: 614.48 km^{2} (237.25 sq mi)
  - Rank: 176th largest in Finland

Population (2025-12-31)
  - Total: 38,773
  - Rank: 29th largest in Finland
  - Density: 78.1/km^{2} (202/sq mi)
  - Demonym: Raumalainen (Finnish) Raumlaine (Dialect)

Population by native language
  - Finnish: 90% (official)
  - Swedish: 0.3%
  - Others: 9.7%

Population by age
  - 0 to 14: 14.5%
  - 15 to 64: 59.3%
  - 65 or older: 26.2%
- Time zone: UTC+02:00 (EET)
  - Summer (DST): UTC+03:00 (EEST)
- Climate: Dfb
- Website: www.rauma.fi/en/

UNESCO World Heritage Site
- Official name: Old Rauma
- Type: Cultural
- Criteria: iv, v
- Designated: 1991
- Reference no.: 582

Rauma (Finnish: [ˈrɑu̯mɑ]; Swedish: Raumo) is a town in Finland, on the western coast of the country. Rauma is in the Satakunta region, by the Gulf of Bothnia. The population of Rauma is approximately 39,000, while the sub-region has a population of approximately 65,000. It is the 29th most populous municipality in Finland.

Rauma lies 92 kilometres (57 mi) north of Turku and 50 kilometres (31 mi) south of Pori. Its neighbouring municipalities are Eura, Eurajoki, Laitila and Pyhäranta. Granted town privileges on 17 April 1442 (then under the rule of Sweden), Rauma is known for its paper and maritime industry, high quality lace (since the 18th century) and the old wooden architecture of the city centre (Old Rauma, Vanha Rauma), which is a UNESCO World Heritage Site. Rauma also has a second UNESCO World Heritage Site, the Bronze Age burial site of Sammallahdenmäki.

== History ==
In the 14th century, before it was declared a town, Rauma had a Franciscan monastery and a Catholic church. In 1550, the townsmen of Rauma were ordered to relocate to Helsinki, but this was unsuccessful and Rauma continued to grow.

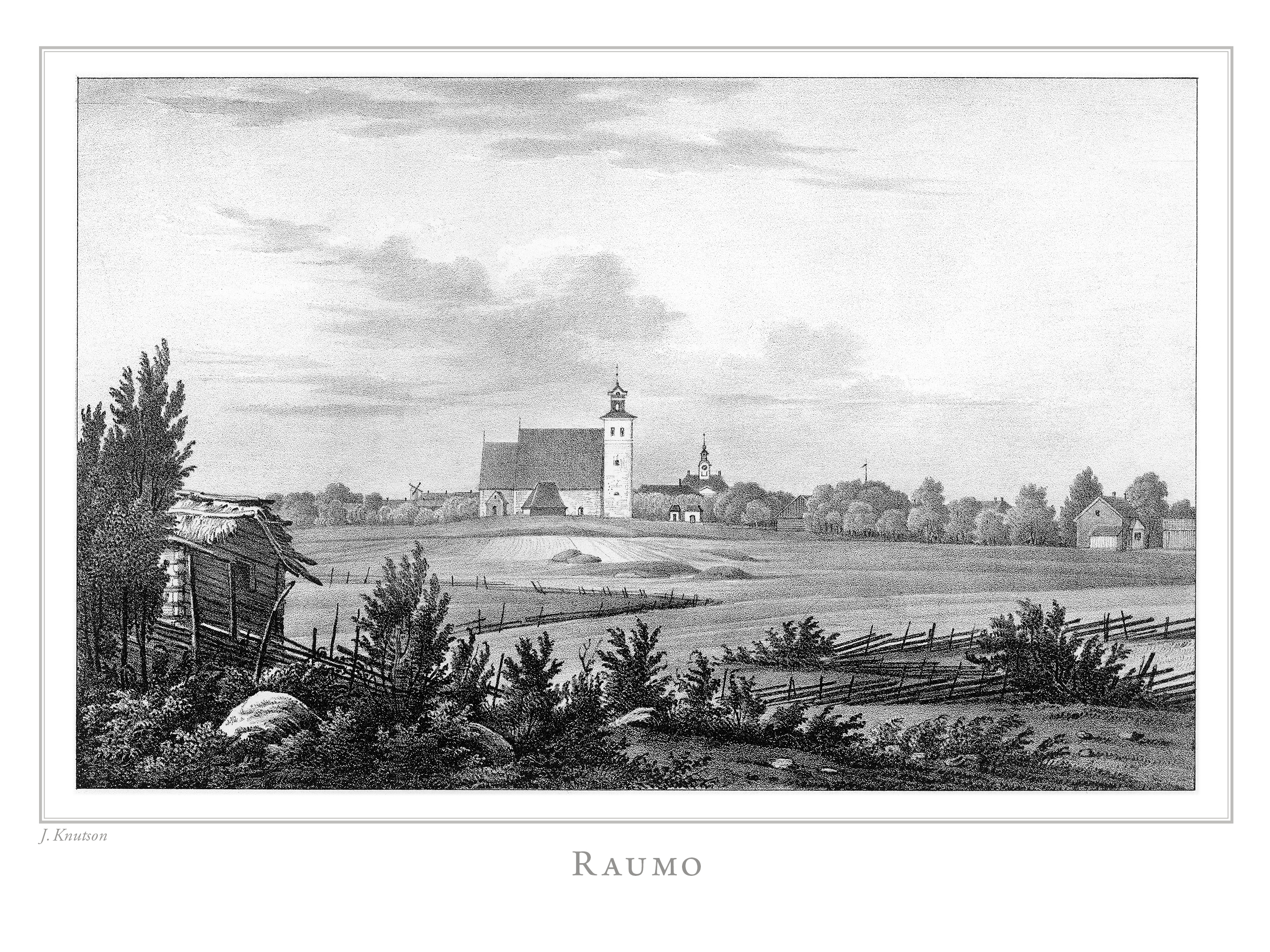
Illustration in Finland framstäldt i teckningar, edited by Zacharias Topelius and published 1845–1852.

Practically the whole wooden part of the town of Rauma was devastated in the fires of 1640 and 1682. The city centre, which mostly comprised the entire town until 1809, has approximately 600 wooden buildings. The Neo-Renaissance style of many of the houses is a result of prosperity brought on by seafaring. In 1897 Rauma had the largest fleet of sailing ships in Finland, totalling 57 vessels. Goods were mainly exported to Germany, Stockholm and the Baltic states. As the Crimean War broke out in 1853, Rauma was attacked by the French and British navies in 1855 during the Åland War. In the 1890s, Rauma got a teacher's college (a 'seminar'), which was later annexed to the University of Turku. A part of the department of education still exists in Rauma.

The name Rauma comes from the Germanic word strauma, meaning "stream".

== Geography ==
=== Neighbourhoods and suburbs ===
Part of the centre (Vanha Rauma, Old Rauma) is a UNESCO World Heritage Site, due to its well-preserve old wooden architecture.

Neighborhoods and suburbs of Rauma include:

- Tarvonsaari
- Merirauma
- Uusi-Lahti
- Kappelinluhta
- Paloahde
- Haapasaari
- Syvärauma
- Kinno
- Kaaro
- Luostarinkylä
- Impivaara
- Äyhö
- Uotila
- Lajo
- Nikulanmäki
- Lensunkallio
- Nummi
- Pyynpää
- Otanlahti
- Pidesluoto
- Komppi
- Lonsi
- Polari
- Sampaanala
- Paroalho
- Kourujärvi
- Kortela
- Monna
- Kourujärvi
- Kodisjoki
- Lappi

=== Climate ===
Rauma has a humid continental climate with cold winters and warm summers. The marine affect from the Gulf of Bothnia brings both warmth in the winter and cooler temperatures in the summer. And similar to other coastal cities of Finland in the south, the average annual temperature in Rauma is about 6 °C (42.8 °F). On February 3 1966, the lowest ever recorded temperature in central Rauma hit -33.6 °C (-28.5 °F), and the highest temperature record being around 33 °C (91.4 °F) with no clear data, due to the weather station's data having been taken into use only in late 2010's.

== Economy ==
After World War II, Rauma developed into an industrial city, the main industries being shipbuilding, paper and pulp mills, and metal industry. Rauma is also the fifth largest port in Finland with almost six million tonnes of shipping per year. Olkiluoto Nuclear Power Plant is located next to Rauma, in Eurajoki. Near Rauma, there is the static-inverter plant of Fenno-Skan.

In 2019 the biggest tax payers in Rauma were Raumaster, Forchem, Länsi-Suomen Osuuspankki, Oras, Alfa Laval Aalborg and LähiTapiola Lännen.

== Demographics ==
=== Population ===
The city of Rauma has 38,773 inhabitants, making it the 29th most populous municipality in Finland. The Rauma region has 64,919 inhabitants.

Population size 1980–2025
Year	Population
1980	42,973
1985	43,564
1990	42,410
1995	42,089
2000	41,001
2005	40,381
2010	39,715
2015	39,809
2020	39,040
2025	38,773

=== Languages ===
Population by
mother tongue (2025)
1. Finnish (90.0%)
2. Ukrainian (1.00%)
3. Russian (0.90%)
4. Polish (0.70%)
5. Estonian (0.60%)
6. Romanian (0.50%)
7. English (0.40%)
8. Other (5.90%)

Rauma is a monolingual Finnish-speaking municipality. The majority of the population, 34,909 persons (90%), spoke Finnish as their first language. In addition, the number of Swedish speakers was 115 persons (0.3%) of the population. Foreign languages were spoken by 9.7% of the population. As English and Swedish are compulsory school subjects, functional bilingualism or trilingualism acquired through language studies is not uncommon.

At least 30 different languages are spoken in Rauma. The most common foreign languages are Ukrainian (1.0%), Russian (0.9%), Polish (0.7%), Estonian (0.6%), Romanian (0.5%) and English (0.4%).

=== Immigration ===
Population by country of birth (2024)
Nationality	Population	%
Finland	35,300	90.6
Soviet Union	396	1.0
Poland	257	0.7
Estonia	257	0.7
Sweden	179	0.5
Romania	171	0.4
Ukraine	167	0.4
Philippines	156	0.4
China	149	0.4
India	147	0.4
Latvia	113	0.3
Other	1,676	4.3

As of 2024, there were 3,725 persons with a foreign background living in Rauma, or 9% of the population. (Note: Statistics Finland classifies a person as having a "foreign background" if both parents or the only known parent were born abroad.) The number of residents who were born abroad was 3,668, or 9% of the population. The number of persons with foreign citizenship living in Rauma was 3,182.

The relative share of immigrants in Rauma's population is below the national average. However, the city's new residents are increasingly of foreign origin. This will increase the proportion of foreign residents in the coming years.

== Transport ==
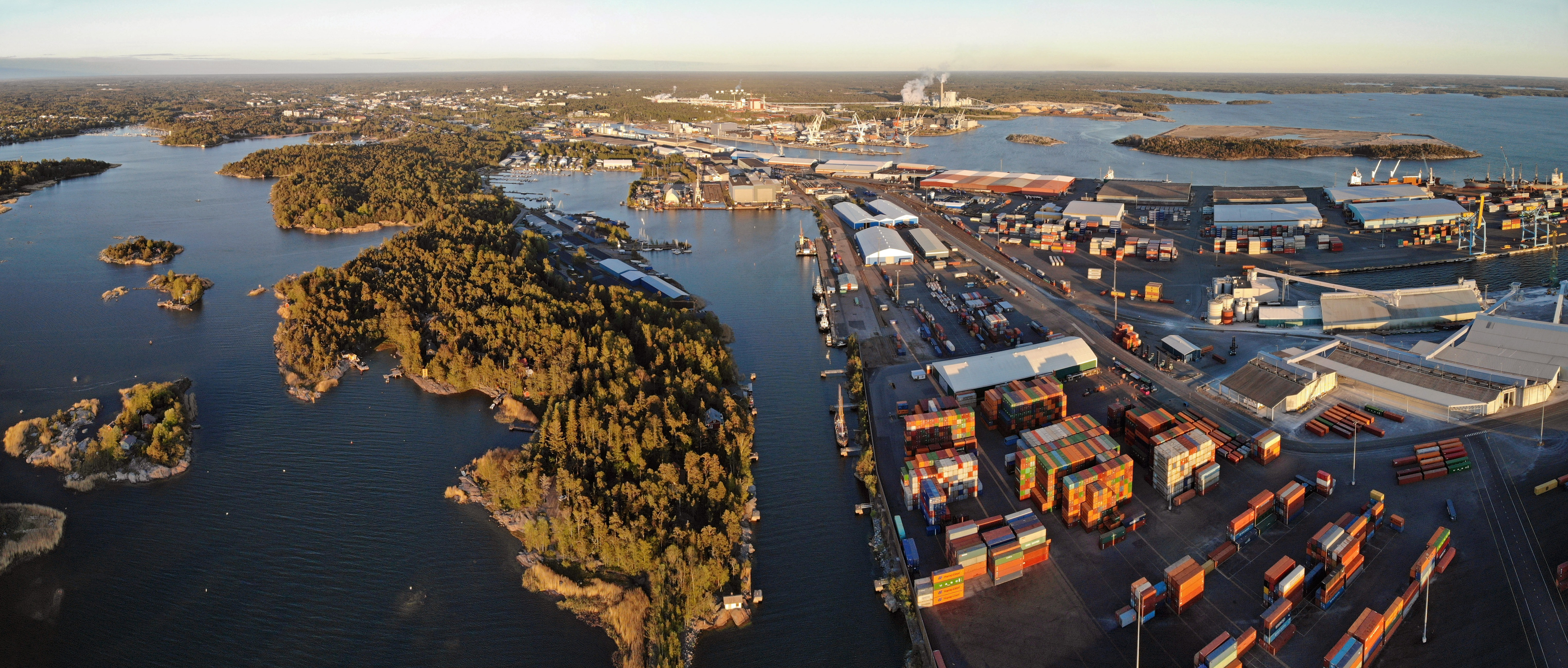
Sunset at the port of Rauma

Rauma is located between Turku and Pori by the national road 8 (E8). Finnish national road 12 starts from Rauma and it was extended to the Port of Rauma in 2008.

A railway connection from Kokemäki is in active freight use, as there is a straight connection to the heavy industry areas and to the port of Rauma. The rail passenger traffic ended in 1988.

Satakunnan Liikenne Oy runs the local bus traffic and it has 3 lines in Rauma. The hub for the local buses is located in Savila while the Long distance buses operate from Rauma bus station. The long distance buses take passengers directly to Pori and Turku and to Tampere and Helsinki with one transfer at Huittinen.

The nearest airport is located in Pori. The port of Rauma serves only freight ships on frequent basis.

== Culture ==
Rauma has its own dialect of Finnish, "Rauman giäl". The dialect inherits words from languages such as Swedish, English and German due to the seafaring past. The dialect has been diluted into mainstream Finnish in day-to-day use, but it is fairly well studied (mainly by Hj. Nortamo) and practised as a hobby.

The town also is the birthplace of Raumism, the non-idealist view of the constructed language Esperanto as a vehicle for culture, rather than as an international auxiliary language.

Rauma Maritime Museum in the Rauma Nautical School building was founded in 1999.

=== Lace Week ===
Annual Lace Week has been arranged in Rauma since year 1971. During the Lace week local craftspeople arrange small exhibitions in the Old Rauma area. The Lace week culminates to the Black Lace Night, when the small boutiques are open late night, various shows and concerts are held and people dress in black lace.

=== Other events ===
- Music festival RMJ, held in Pori in 2008 and 2009.
- Classical music festival Festivo
- Jazz-happening Rauma Summer Jazz
- Creative and performing music arts festival Klustermus
- Movie festival Blue Sea Film Festival
- Blues festival Rauma Blues

== Sports ==
Rauman Lukko is the local ice hockey team. Founded in 1936, Lukko plays in SM-liiga, the top professional league in Finland. Lukko has won the Finnish championship twice, in 1963 and 2021. Their home arena is Äijänsuo Arena. Local football teams are Pallo-Iirot and FC Rauma. These two teams share the same home field at Äijänsuo sports centre.

Sea City Storm is an American football team playing in the Finnish American Football Association's 2nd division. Fera is a women's Finnish baseball team, whose home field is the Länsi-Suomi Arena at Otanlahti sports centre.

Rauma also has an own orienteering club, Rasti-Lukko, two basketball teams known as Kaaron Roima and Rauma Basket, a rinkball team called UKP and a floorball team named SalBa.

== Recreation ==
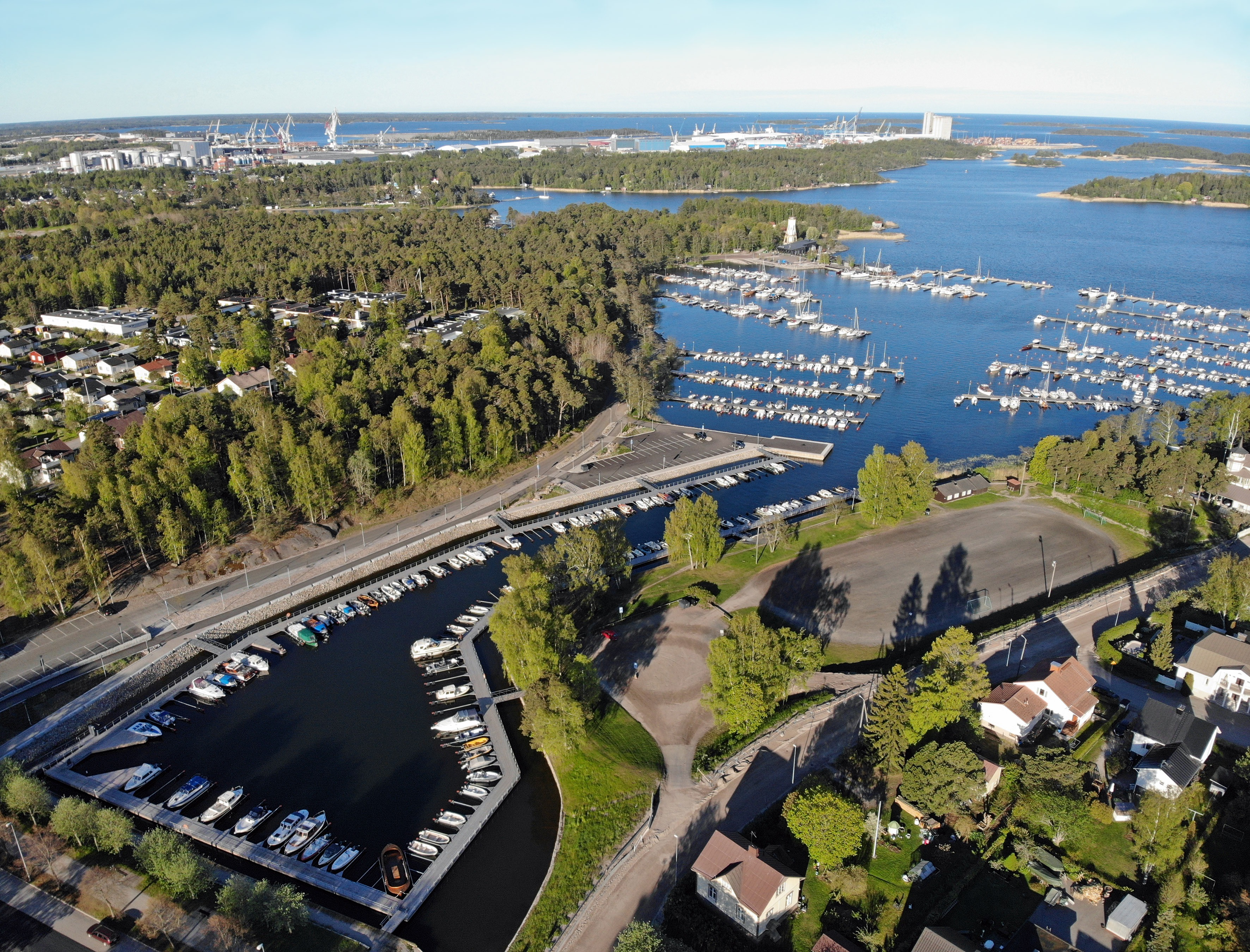
Marina in Rauma, Finland

One popular saying goes that every family in Rauma owns a boat – this is not true, though the city has room for ca. 2,800 boats at its docks. People can use their own boats or water buses to get to the Kylmäpihlaja Lighthouse that doubles as a hotel and recreation site. Water buses take people to Reksaari island and former garrison island of Kuuskajaskari. Both islands are in recreational use.

== Consolidation of municipalities ==
Rauma and the surrounding municipality of Rauman maalaiskunta ("rural municipality of Rauma") were consolidated in 1993, continued in 2007 with the consolidation of municipality of Kodisjoki. The municipality of Lappi was consolidated to Rauma in 2009.

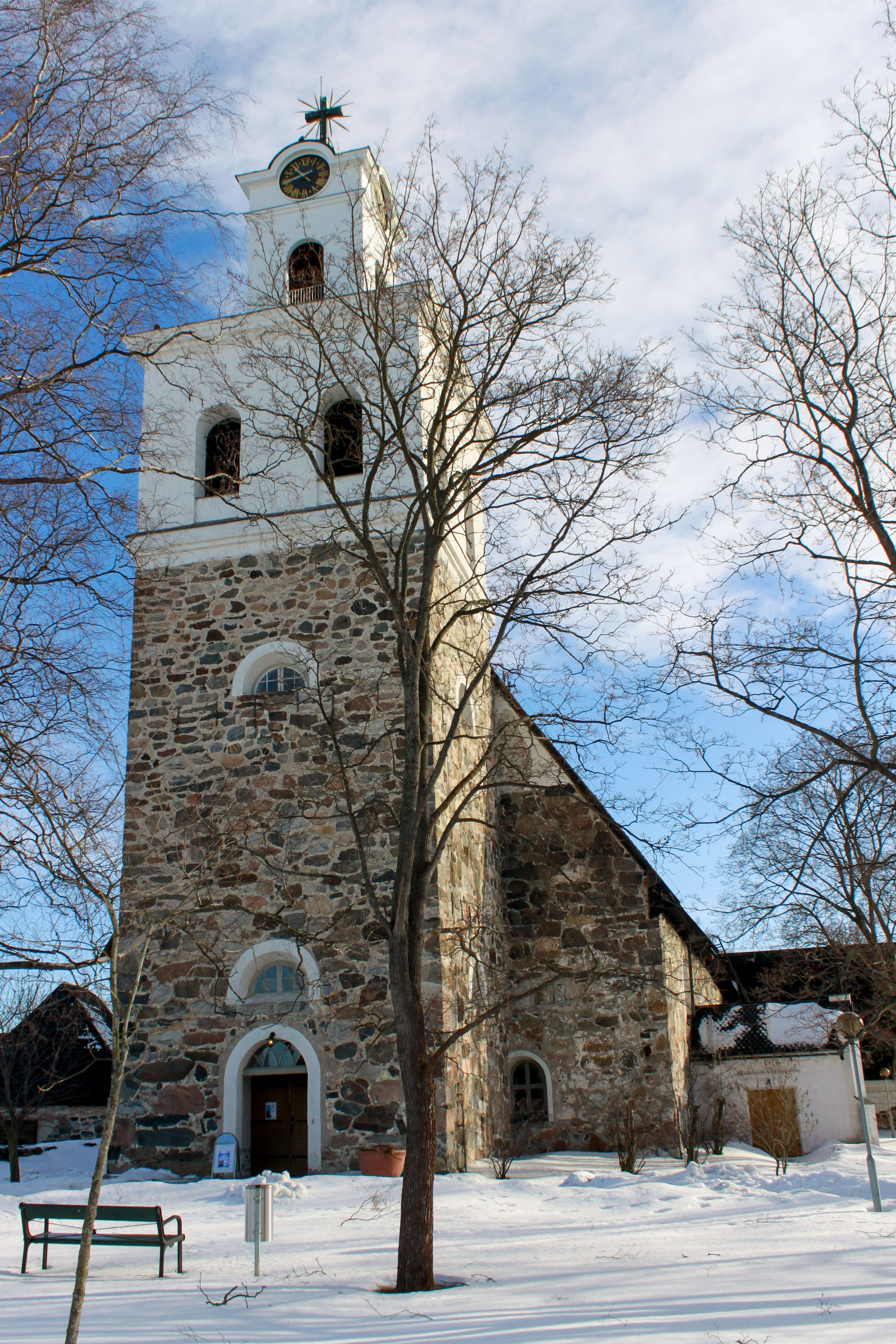
Tower of the Church of The Holy Cross

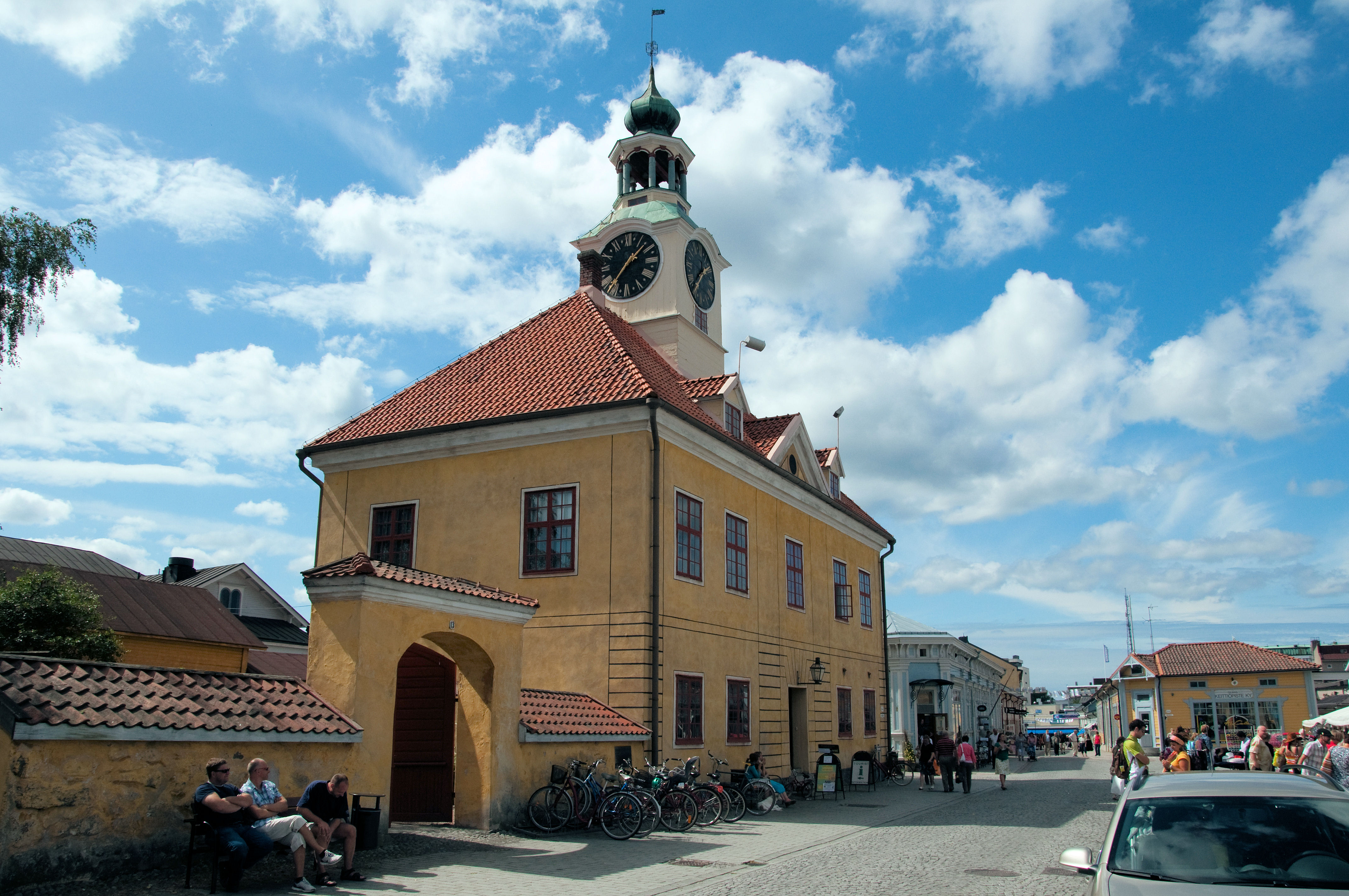
The old town hall of Rauma

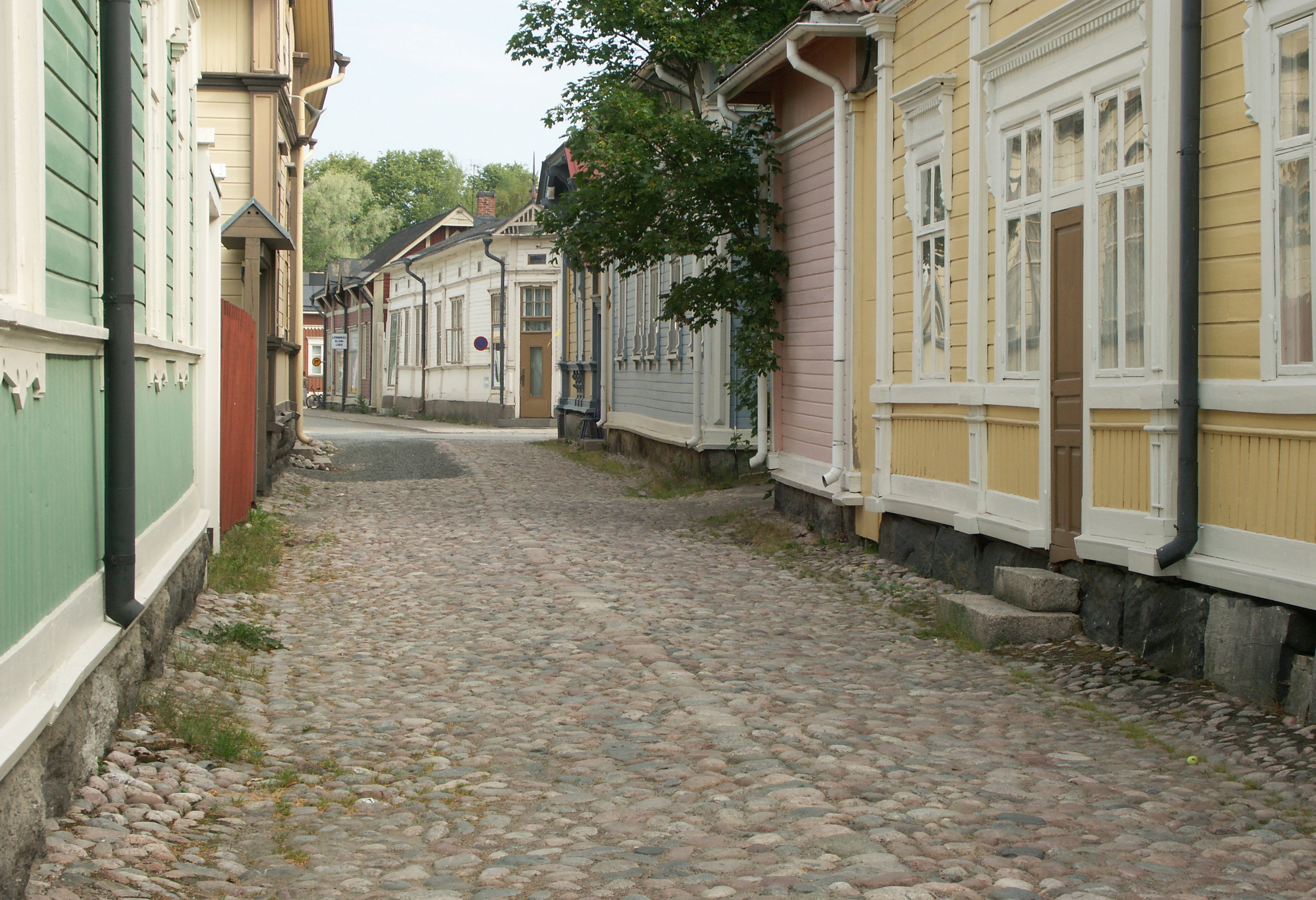
Street in city centre

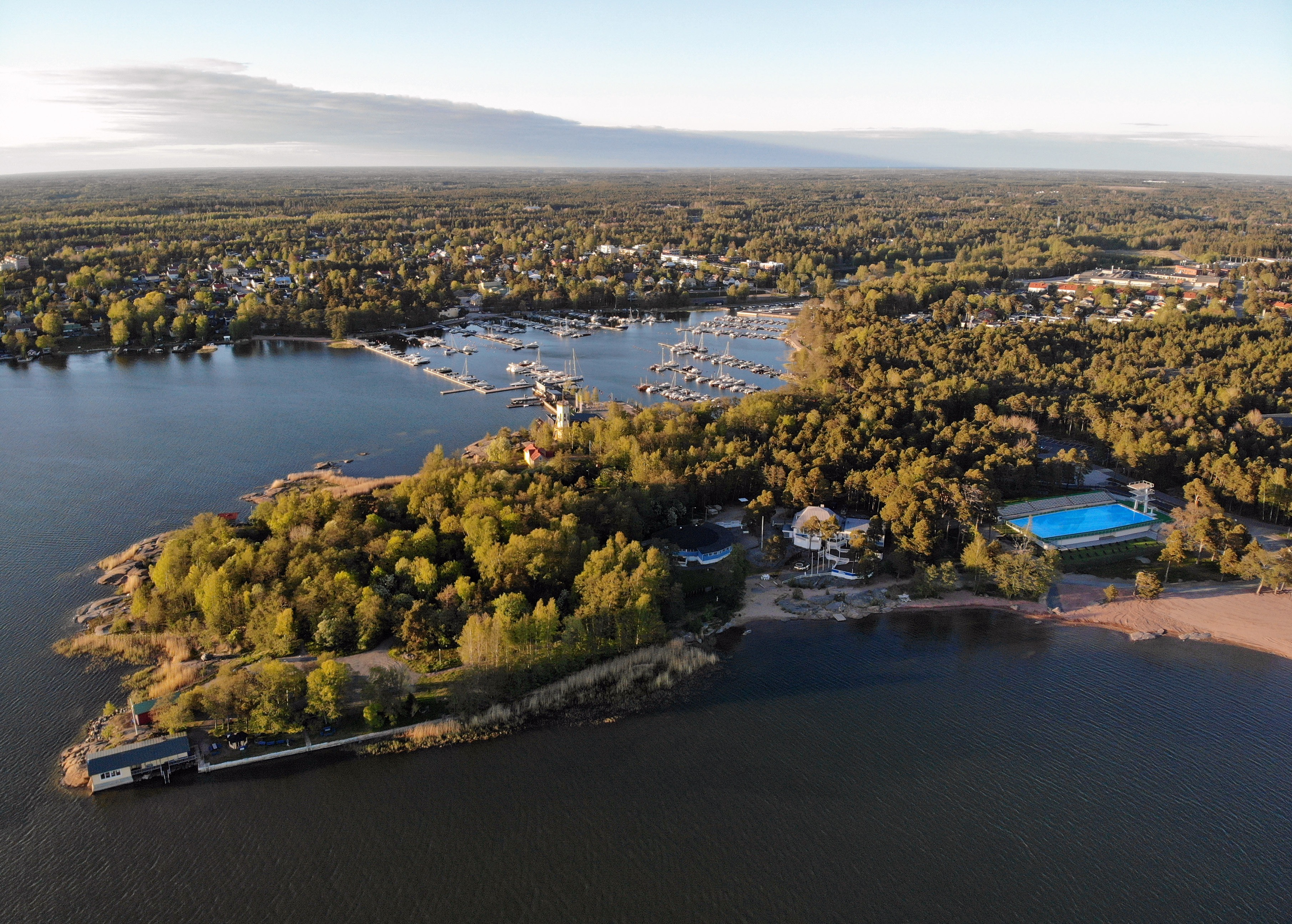
Fåfänga

== International relations ==
=== Twin towns — Sister cities ===
Rauma is twinned with the following cities and towns:

Gjøvik, Norway; Næstved, Denmark; Gävle Municipality, Sweden	Kolpino, Russia; Kaposvár, Hungary

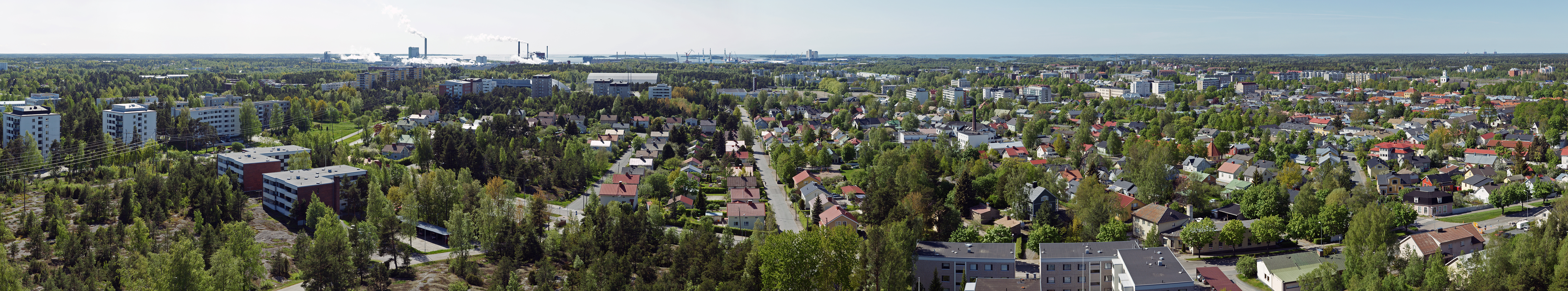
Panoramic view of Rauma

== Notable people ==
- Sebastian Aho, professional ice hockey player
- Markus Niemelä, racing driver
- Antti Raanta, professional ice hockey goaltender
- Timo Soini, former Finnish foreign minister
- Jorma Tommila, actor

== See also ==
- Rauma dialect
- Raumism – Ideology
