= Kylmäpihlaja Lighthouse =

Lighthouse in Finland

Kylmäpihlaja lighthouse Kylmäpihlaja
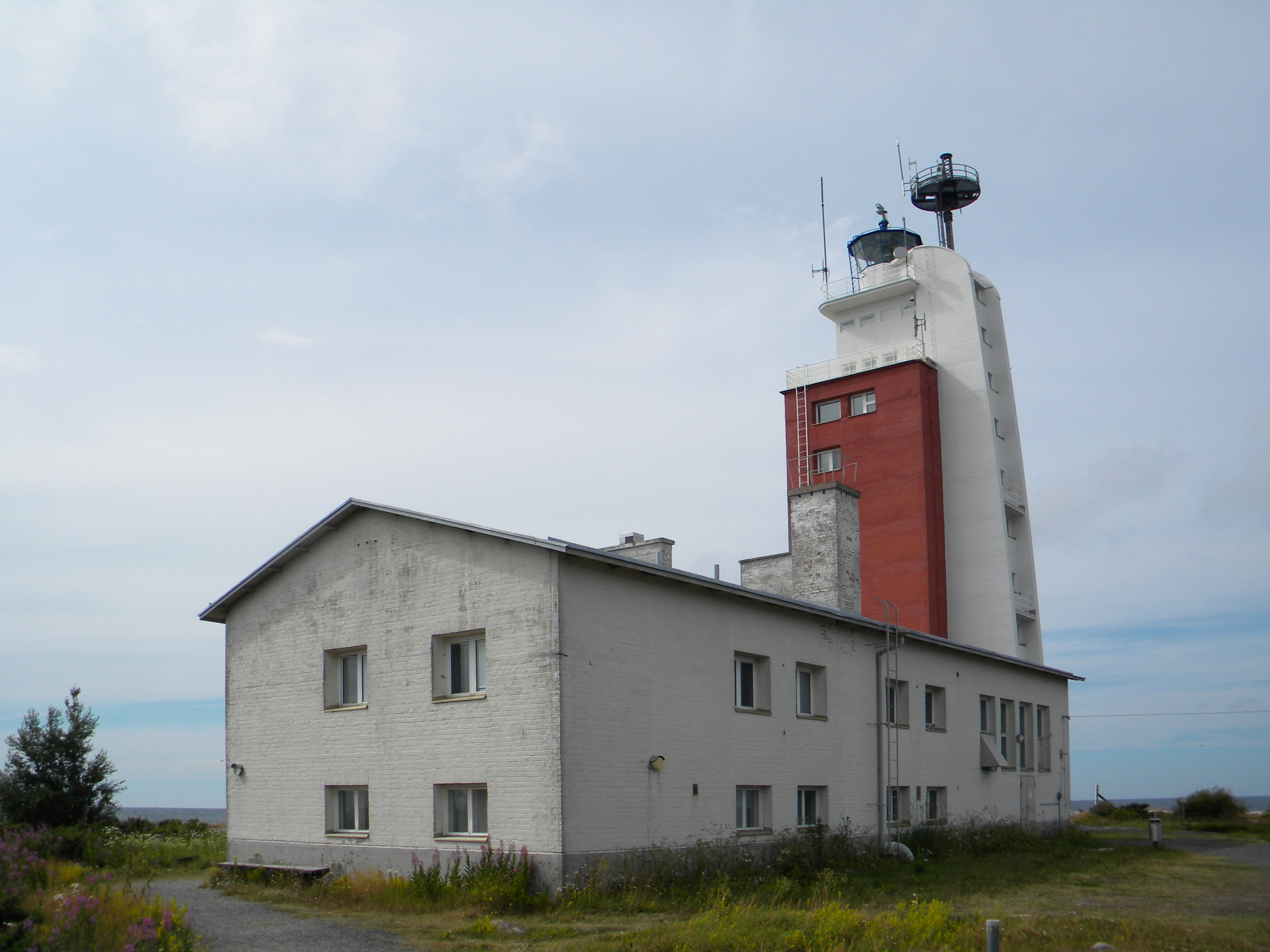
- Kylmäpihlaja in 2010
- Location: Bothnian Sea
- Coordinates: 61.1446°N 21.3029°E

Tower
- Constructed: 1953
- Height: 32 m (105 ft)
- Markings: white, red

Light
- Focal height: 36 m (118 ft)
- Range: 17.1 nmi (31.7 km; 19.7 mi)
- Characteristic: Fl(4) W 45s

Kylmäpihlaja Lighthouse (Finnish: Kylmäpihlajan majakka) is a combined lighthouse and pilot station located on the small island of Kylmäpihlaja, in the outer archipelago of Rauma, Finland, some 10 kilometres (5.4 nmi) from the mainland in the Bothnian Sea. It serves the southern shipping lane of the Port of Rauma.

== Facilities ==
Commissioned in 1953, the lighthouse replaced an earlier lightvessel, which was relocated to Kemi.

The facilities, in addition to the light, include a fog horn, radar and radio beacon, as well as a diesel-powered engine-generator which provided the island's electricity until the 1980s, when a cable was laid down connecting the island to the mainland.

The light source has been electric from the outset, although this was earlier backed up by a gas light which would operate automatically in the event of a power cut. When the cable connection with the mainland was installed, the gas light was removed and the island's generator now provides the backup power.

== Accommodation ==
The lighthouse building comprises a 12-storey tower and a two-storey accommodation block. These originally housed the station's staff of two lighthouse keepers, twelve pilots and eight pilot boat drivers.

After the pilot operations were relocated in the 1990s, the City of Rauma acquired the property, which now operates as a seasonal hotel with 15 rooms and a restaurant, as well as a guest marina. The navigational and radar facilities remain with the Finnish Maritime Administration.
