= Tarvonsaari =

- Neighbourhood
- Location in Finland
- Coordinates: 61°7′43″N 21°30′1″E
- Country: Finland
- Region: Satakunta
- Sub-Region: Rauma sub-region
- Municipality: Rauma

Tarvonsaari is a neighbourhood of Rauma, Finland. It is located in the centre of the city.
