= Port of Rauma =

Port in Rauma, Finland

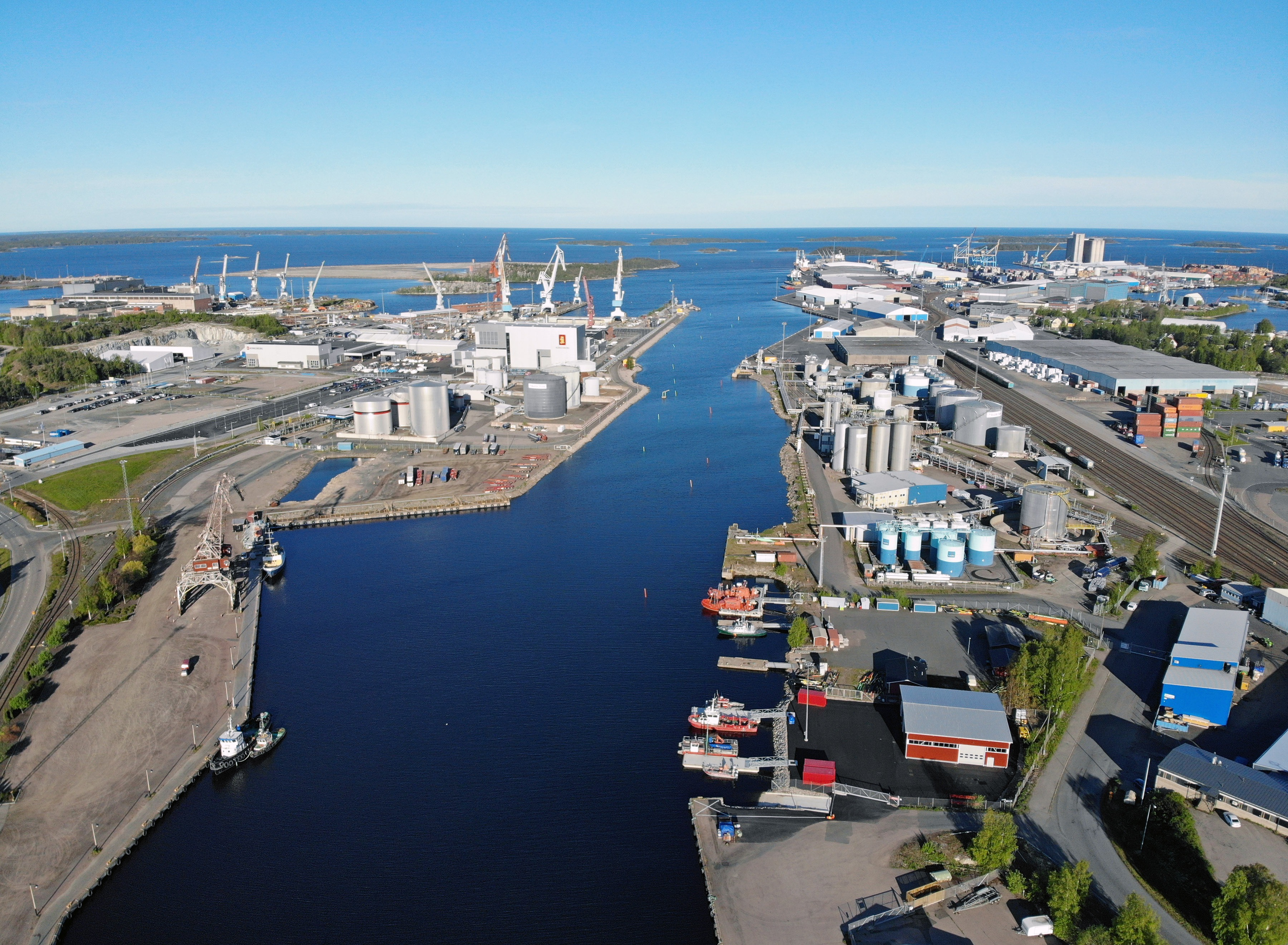
- Port of Rauma pictured in 2020
- Click on the map for a fullscreen view
- Port of Rauma (Finland)
- Native name: Rauman satama – Raumo hamn

Location
- Country: Finland
- Location: Rauma
- Coordinates: 61.126389°N 21.427778°E
- UN/LOCODE: FI RAU

Details
- Operated by: Rauman Satama Oy
- Type of harbour: coastal natural
- Draft depth: max. 9.0 metres (29.5 ft) depth

Statistics
- Annual cargo tonnage: c. 5.8m tons (int'l) (2018)
- Website https://portofrauma.com/en/

The Port of Rauma is a cargo port located in the city of Rauma, Finland on the shore of the southern part of Gulf of Bothnia.

In 2018, the port handled c. 5.8 million tons of international cargo, of which 72% was exports. The main export products were paper and cardboard, pulp and sawn timber, together accounting for approximately 80% of the total tonnage.

== Specifications ==
The port comprises the following infrastructure:

- "Petäjäs" quay: length 495 metres (1,624 ft), depth 11.0 metres (36.1 ft)
- Container quay, old: length 160 metres (520 ft), depth 11.0 metres (36.1 ft)
- Container quay, new: length 350 metres (1,150 ft), depth 13.6 metres (45 ft)
- "Iso-Hakuni" quay: 5 side/rear loading berths, depth 11.0 metres (36.1 ft)
- Oil terminal quay: depth 9.15 metres (30.0 ft)
- Central harbour: length 605 metres (1,985 ft), depth 6.7–7.5 metres (22–25 ft)
- "Laitsaari" and chemicals terminal quay: length 347 metres (1,138 ft) (combined), depth 8.85 metres (29.0 ft)

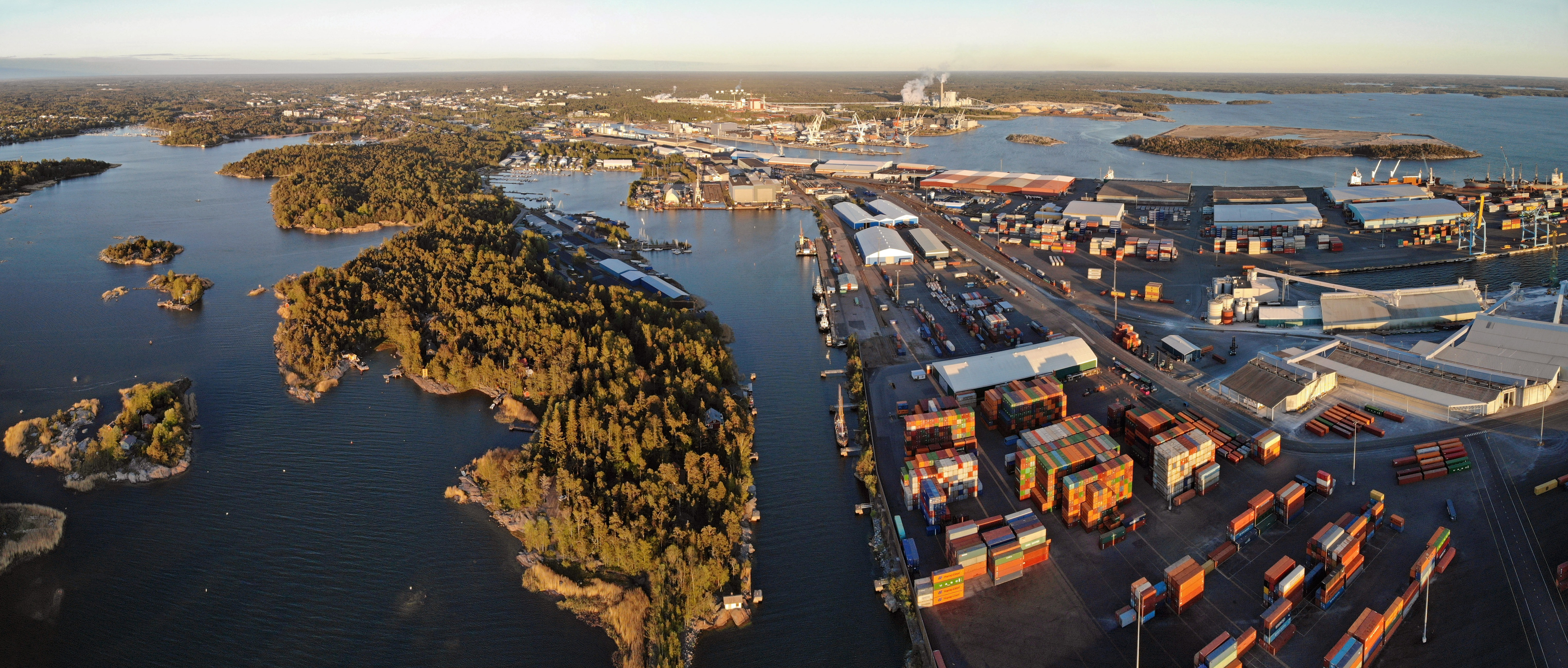
Aerial view of the port

== See also ==
- Kylmäpihlaja Lighthouse
- Ports of the Baltic Sea
