= Merirauma =

- Neighbourhood
- Location in Finland
- Coordinates: 61°8′53″N 21°28′0″E
- Country: Finland
- Region: Satakunta
- Sub-Region: Rauma sub-region
- Municipality: Rauma

Merirauma is a neighbourhood of Rauma, Finland. It is located in the northeast of the city and features several islands offshore including Kuuskari, Polla and Kaskinen.
