= Uotila =

Uotila is a Finnish surname. Notable people with the surname include:

- Leena Uotila (born 1947), Finnish actress
- Kari Uotila (born 1955), Finnish politician
- Sami Uotila (actor) (born 1971), Finnish actor
- Sami Uotila (skier) (born 1976), Finnish alpine skier
- Maikki Uotila (born 1977), Finnish ice dancer
- Juha Uotila (born 1985), Finnish professional ice hockey defenceman
