= List of ports in the United States =

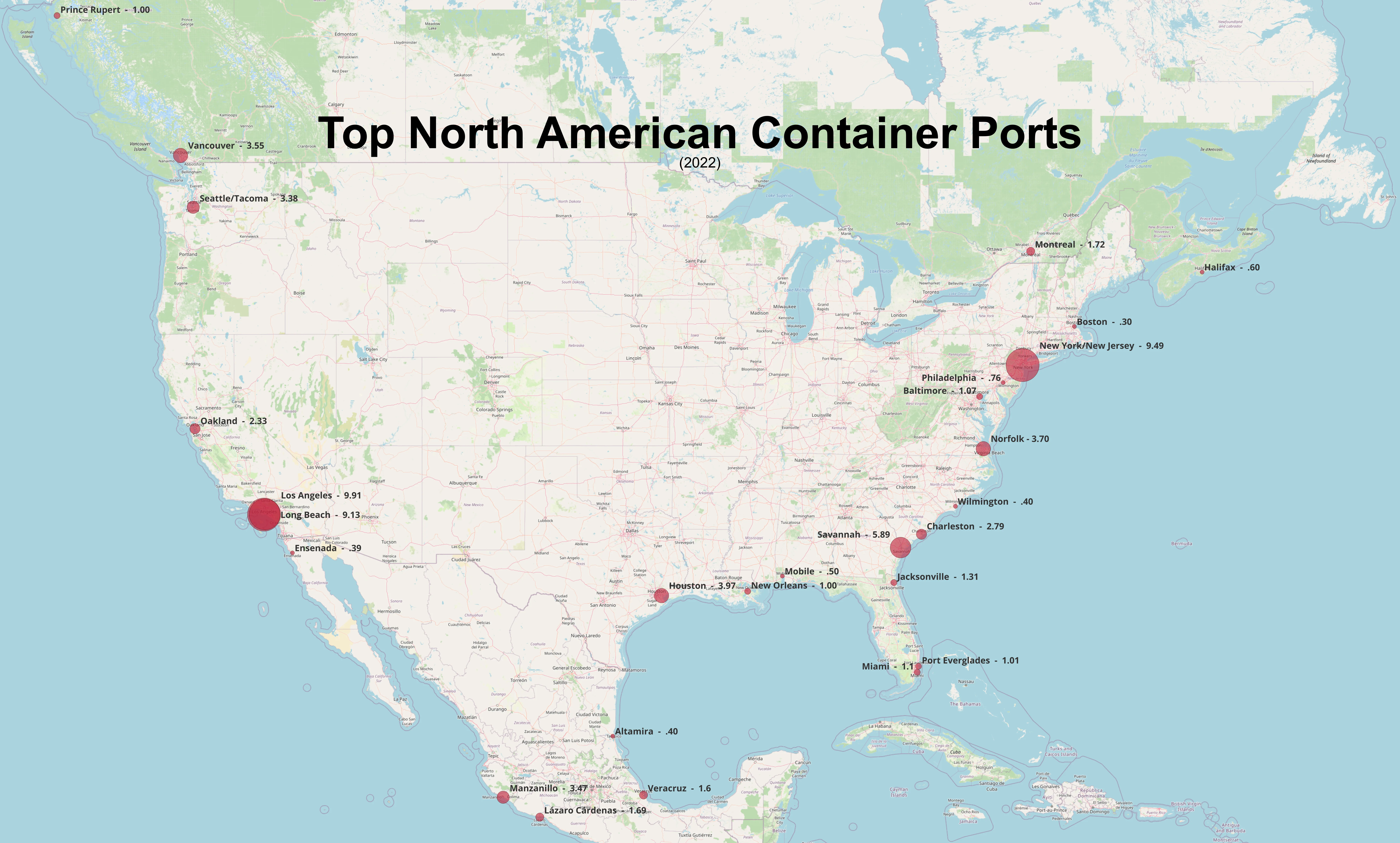
North American container ports

This is a list of ports of the United States, ranked by tonnage. Ports in the United States handle a wide variety of goods that are critical to the global economy, including petroleum, grain, steel, automobiles, and containerized goods. See the articles on individual ports for more information, including history, geography, and statistics.

== Top 50 U.S. ports by tonnage ==
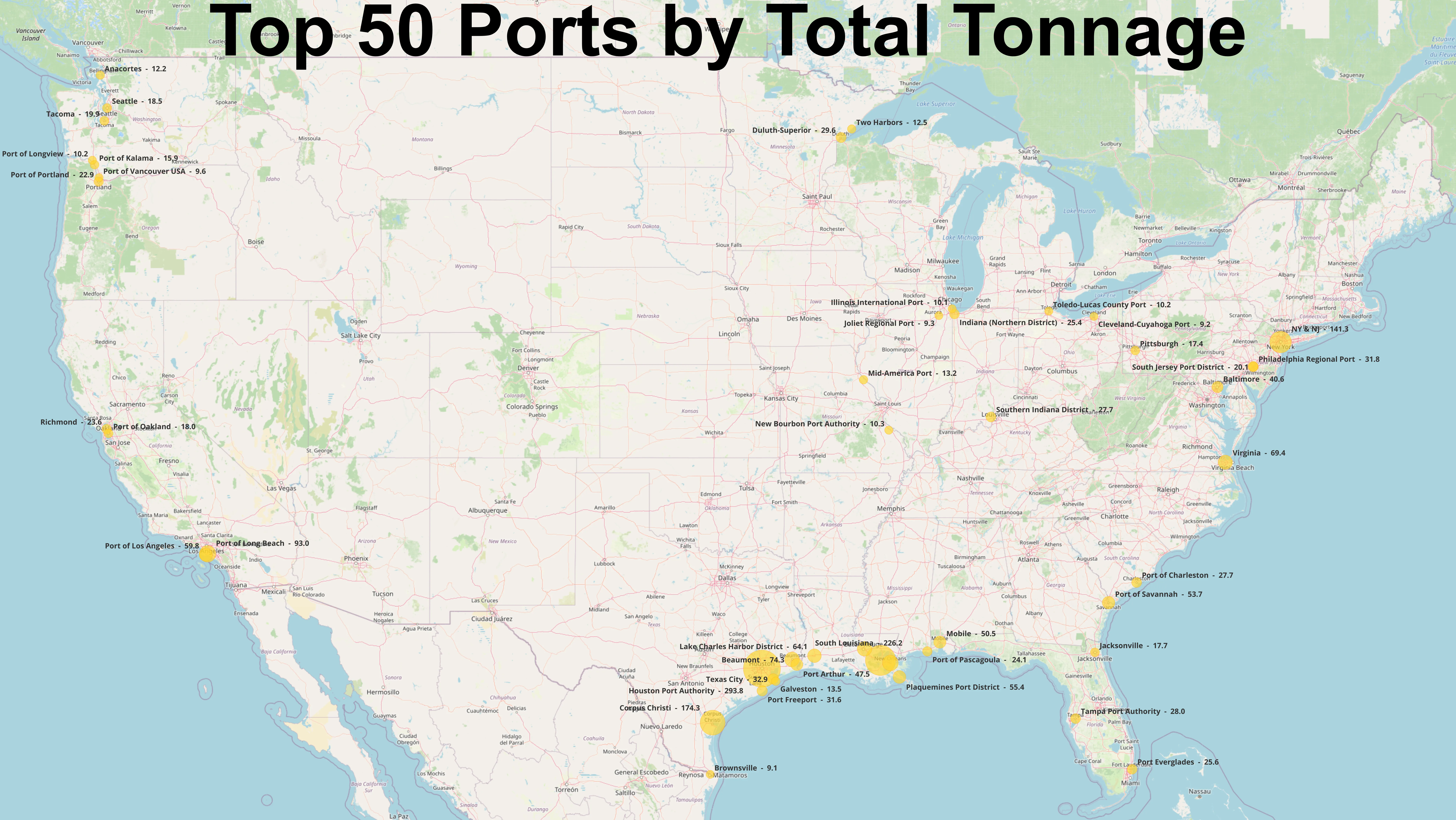
Top 50 ports by tonnage

The Bureau of Transportation Statistics (BTS) issues an annual report, the US ports and states data, pursuant to the Fixing America’s Surface Transportation Act (section 6018 of the "FAST" Act), of the top 25 ports in the United States. Since 2015, as recommended by the BTS director, is produced by the US Army Corps of Engineers (USACE) through the Institute for Water Resources, in conjunction with the United States Department of Transportation"s (USDOT or DOT) and the Bureau of Transportation Statistics and Maritime Administration.

Other ports on the Corps of Engineers list include the Port of Houston in the number one spot. South Louisiana is second, then Corpus Christi; New York/New Jersey; Long Beach, California; New Orleans; Beaumont and Baton Rouge.

As of May 2024 the Port of Lake Charles surged to the number 10 on the list below.

Cargo volume at U.S. ports, 2023 , short tons
Rank (by total trade)	Port name	State	Total trade	Domestic total	Foreign total	Foreign imports	Foreign exports
1	Port of Houston	Texas	275,940,289	79,177,826	196,762,463	56,970,738	139,791,725
2	Port of South Louisiana	Louisiana	225,086,697	112,372,057	112,714,640	30,423,984	82,290,656
3	Port of Corpus Christi	Texas	150,755,485	25,056,307	125,699,178	17,606,086	108,093,092
4	Port of New York and New Jersey; Port Newark	New Jersey; New York	123,697,438	40,087,797	83,609,641	68,357,078	15,252,563
5	Port of New Orleans	Louisiana	81,067,448	43,220,217	37,847,231	15,324,118	22,523,113
6	Port of Long Beach	California	79,178,087	13,490,353	65,687,734	46,552,104	19,135,630
7	Port of Greater Baton Rouge	Louisiana	71,686,872	43,420,458	28,266,414	5,662,827	22,603,587
8	Port of Beaumont	Texas	70,567,386	24,785,761	45,781,625	16,170,960	29,610,665
9	Port of Los Angeles	California	59,452,139	4,501,365	54,950,774	38,658,365	16,292,409
10	Port of Hampton Roads	Virginia	58,048,785	4,956,369	53,092,416	12,362,773	40,729,643
11	Port of Mobile	Alabama	53,206,561	18,794,083	34,412,478	17,859,999	16,552,479
12	Plaquemines Port	Louisiana	46,750,799	25,879,971	20,870,828	4,555,969	16,314,859
13	Port of Savannah	Georgia	43,453,044	1,135,777	42,317,267	24,505,366	17,811,901
14	Port of Lake Charles	Louisiana	43,053,658	20,333,504	22,720,154	5,026,406	17,693,748
15	Port of Port Arthur	Texas	41,222,200	17,297,108	23,925,092	7,316,835	16,608,257
16	Port Freeport	Texas	38,748,662	4,171,925	34,576,737	6,560,377	28,016,360
17	Mid-Ohio Valley Port	Ohio; West Virginia	35,939,474	35,939,474	N/A	N/A	N/A
18	Port of Baltimore	Maryland	35,202,027	4,211,847	30,990,180	12,937,138	18,053,042
19	Ports of Cincinnati-Northern KY	Ohio; Kentucky	34,476,340	34,476,340	N/A	N/A	N/A
20	Port of Texas City	Texas	33,721,312	12,540,971	21,180,341	7,601,309	13,579,032
21	Port of St. Louis and East St. Louis	Missouri; Illinois	30,487,796	30,487,796	N/A	N/A	N/A
22	Port of Huntington Tri-State	West Virginia; Kentucky; Ohio	29,699,657	29,699,657	N/A	N/A	N/A
23	Port of Philadelphia	Pennsylvania	28,517,760	11,589,634	16,928,126	9,833,680	7,094,446
24	Port Tampa Bay	Florida	28,511,760	15,913,148	12,598,612	8,250,523	4,348,089
25	Valdez	Alaska	25,113,231	23,019,746	2,093,485	0	2,093,485
26	Twin Ports of Duluth and Superior	Minnesota; Wisconsin	25,071,110	19,363,238	5,707,872	692,776	5,015,096
27	Port of Charleston	South Carolina	24,947,482	1,822,973	23,124,509	14,996,099	8,128,410
28	Northern Indiana Maritime District	Indiana	24,684,060	24,128,574	555,486	512,759	42,727
29	Pascagoula	Mississippi	23,096,778	8,311,645	14,785,133	7,450,788	7,334,345
30	Port of Seattle	Washington	22,964,546	4,814,772	18,149,774	9,098,134	9,051,640
31	Port of Tacoma	Washington	21,575,059	4,186,844	17,388,215	5,794,811	11,593,404
32	Port of Richmond	California	21,050,741	6,277,538	14,773,203	11,494,554	3,278,649
33	Port of Portland	Oregon	20,706,345	6,391,344	14,315,001	2,218,431	12,096,570
34	Port Everglades	Florida	20,440,573	11,177,768	9,262,805	6,498,551	2,764,254
35	South Jersey	New Jersey	20,254,325	8,383,229	11,871,096	11,271,285	599,811
36	Port of Oakland	California	19,439,762	1,313,835	18,125,927	8,520,142	9,605,785
37	Kalama	Washington	18,140,886	1,393,416	16,747,470	328,888	16,418,582
38	Port of Jacksonville	Florida	16,701,370	7,892,986	8,808,384	7,379,715	1,428,669
39	Port of Pittsburgh	Pennsylvania	15,536,051	15,536,051	N/A	N/A	N/A
40	New Bourbon Port Authority	Missouri	15,506,754	15,506,754	N/A	N/A	N/A
41	Mid-America Port	Iowa; Illinois; Missouri	14,952,343	14,952,343	N/A	N/A	N/A
42	Illinois Waterway Ports	Illinois	14,946,034	14,946,034	N/A	N/A	N/A
43	Two Harbors	Minnesota	13,499,847	11,746,091	1,753,756	0	1,753,756
44	Port of Boston	Massachusetts	13,322,582	3,399,778	9,922,804	8,310,101	1,612,703
45	Port of Honolulu	Hawaii	12,261,506	11,424,582	836,924	619,948	216,976
46	Port of Galveston	Texas	11,945,182	5,242,679	6,702,503	1,525,032	5,177,471
47	Port of Longview	Washington	11,071,285	1,145,333	9,925,952	338,172	9,587,780
48	Port of Vancouver USA	Washington	10,198,602	2,557,938	7,640,664	1,128,602	6,512,062
49	Port of Cleveland	Ohio	9,442,739	7,655,827	1,786,912	1,359,394	427,518
50	Port of San Juan	Puerto Rico	9,337,163	4,611,787	4,725,376	4,285,535	439,841

== Non-continental islands ==
Ports of non-continental islands
Port	State or territory	GNIS feature ID # and reference Link	Coordinates	Elevation	External link
Port of San Juan	Puerto Rico		18°40′0.01″N 66°10′0.01″W		
Marina Puerto Chico, Fajardo	Puerto Rico	1613388	18°20′54″N 65°38′6″W	20 feet (6.1 m)	
Port of Ponce	Puerto Rico		18°0′4.54″N 66°43′0.01″W		
Christiansted, St Croix, Virgin Islands Port Authority	US Virgin Islands		17°45′9.76″N 64°43′56.71″W		
Hilo	Hawaii		19°43′43″N 155°4′32.88″W		
Kawaihae Harbor	Hawaii		20°2′16.01″N 155°49′59.88″W		
Kahului	Hawaii		20°53′55″N 156°28′22.08″W		
Port of Honolulu	Hawaii		21°18′40″N 157°52′18.12″W		
Kalaeloa	Hawaii		21°17′50.03″N 158°6′32.04″W		
Nawiliwili	Hawaii		21°57′40″N 159°21′11.16″W)		
Middle Ground harbor, Port of Guam	Guam	1389888	13°27′17″N 144°38′20″E	0 feet (0 m)	
Agat harbor, Port of Guam	Guam	1934126	13°22′0″N 144°38′53″E	0 feet (0 m)	
Ports of Saipan-Commonwealth Ports Authority of CNMI	Northern Mariana Islands		15°13′33″N 145°44′03″E		

== See also ==
- List of ports and harbours of the Atlantic Ocean
- List of ports and harbors of the Pacific Ocean
- List of ports and harbors of the Arctic Ocean
- Inland port § North America
- Louisiana International Terminal
- Dubai Ports World controversy
- United States container ports
