= List of the busiest cruise ports in the Caribbean =

This is a list of the busiest cruise ports in the Caribbean region by total passenger traffic. It intends to include cruise ports located in the Caribbean Sea, including those located on the continental mainland and islands. It also includes ports in the Guianas in South America and Bermuda in the Sargasso Sea, which are part of the Caribbean Community. The ranking is ordered according to total passenger traffic per calendar or fiscal year. The statistics represent data reported by the port operator, a government entity, or a news outlet.

== List ==
Port	Country/terrirory	Passengers	Year
Ports of Out Islands	Bahamas	8,965,950	2025
Port of Nassau	Bahamas	6,070,532	2025
Port of Cozumel	Mexico	4,730,000	2025
Port of Mahahual	Mexico	2,400,000	2025
Port of San Juan	Puerto Rico	1,615,039	2025
Port of Philipsburg	Sint Maarten	1,597,940	2025
Ports of Saint Thomas and Saint John	United States Virgin Islands	1,553,170	2025
Port of Roatán	Honduras	1,400,000	2025
Port of Grand Turk Island	Turks and Caicos Islands	1,301,512	2025
Port of Taino Bay	Dominican Republic	1,126,485	2025
Port of Amber Cove	Dominican Republic	1,076,149	2025
Port of George Town	Cayman Islands	1,062,221	2023
Port of Oranjestad	Aruba	970,803	2025
Port of Belize	Belize	967,214	2025
Port Zante	Saint Kitts and Nevis	925,289	2025
Port of Bridgetown	Barbados	894,820	2025
Port of Willemstad	Curaçao	881,665	2025
Port of Tortola	British Virgin Islands	875,127	2025
Port of St. John’s	Antigua and Barbuda	806,841	2025
Port of Castries	Saint Lucia	668,086	2024
Port of Ocho Rios	Jamaica	577,498	2024
Port of Falmouth	Jamaica	564,267	2024
Port of Royal Naval Dockyard	Bermuda	467,525	2025
Port of Kralendijk	Bonaire	463,000	2025
Port of Cartagena	Colombia	414,204	2025
Port of Roseau	Dominica	375,646	2025
Port of St. George's	Grenada	370,787	2025
Port of Montego Bay	Jamaica	358,865	2024
Port of Fort-de-France	Martinique	322,640	2025
Port of La Romana	Dominican Republic	278,791	2025
Port of Kingstown	Saint Vincent and the Grenadines	244,390	2025
Port of Saint Croix	United States Virgin Islands	241,612	2025
Port of Cabo Rojo	Dominican Republic	176,690	2025
Port of Samaná	Dominican Republic	64,218	2025
Port of Santo Domingo	Dominican Republic	59,618	2025
Port of San Andrés	Colombia	58,449	2025
Port of Scarborough	Trinidad and Tobago	50,000	2025
Port of Isla Catalina	Dominican Republic	33,781	2025
Port of Port of Spain	Trinidad and Tobago	17,317	2025
Port of Road Bay	Anguilla	14,769	2025
Ports of Cayenne and Salvation Islands	French Guiana	8,307	2025

== See also ==
- List of busiest cruise ports by passengers
