= Haina Occidental Port =

- Interactive map of Haina Occidental Port
- Rio Haina in the Dominican Republic.

Location
- Country: Dominican Republic
- Coordinates: 18°25′N 70°00′W

The Haina Occidental Port (often referred to as "Rio Haina") is commercial port located at the mouth of the Haina River in Dominican Republic near Santo Domingo, the capital city. Inaugurated by President Trujillo in 1953, the port specializes in the handling of containerized cargo, bulk, liquids, chemicals, vehicles, and general cargo.

== Overview ==
Haina Port has two terminals, which are located on either side of the Haina River. The older terminal is called Haina Occidental Terminal (which is the current name of the Port), and the newer terminal is named Haina Oriental Terminal.

According to a statistical report submitted by Dominican Port Authority (APORDOM) for January to June 2017, Multimodal Caucedo Port had 66.3% of TEU (Twenty-foot Equivalent Unit) movement in the island, followed by Rio Haina Port with 27.4%, and the other ports in the Dominican Republic handling 6.1%.

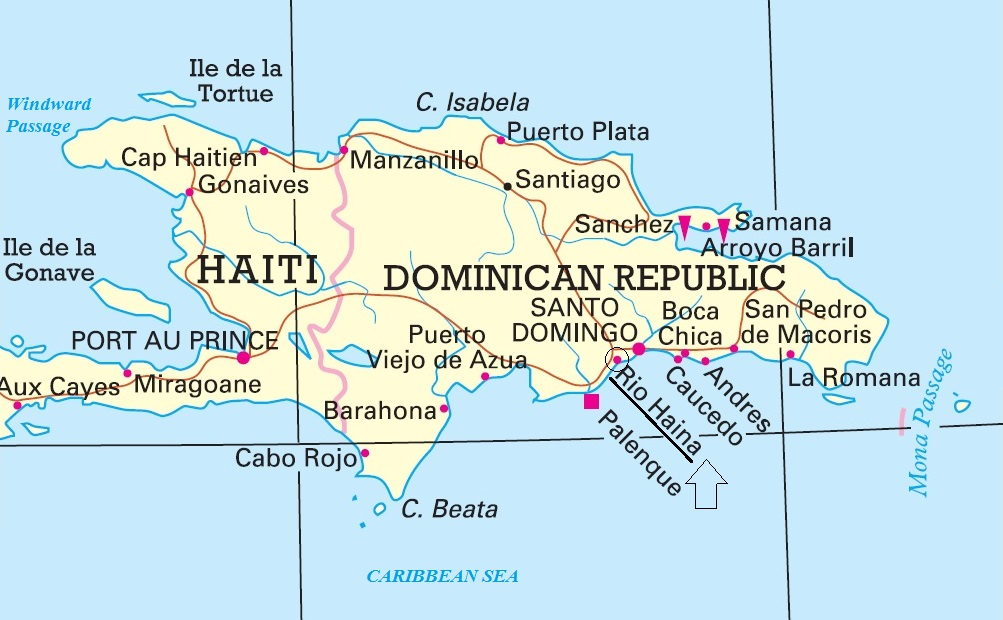
Map of Dominican Republic showing location of Rio Haina

== Port information ==
- HAI - HAINA
- Local time: UTC−4
- Weather/climate/prevailing winds: From May 15 until September 15
- Climate: mostly sunny, tropical. Hurricane season runs from June to November
- Prevailing winds: direction ENE–ESE
- Average temperature range: 28–30 °C

== See also ==
- List of ports and harbours of the Atlantic Ocean
