= List of busiest cruise ports by passengers =

This is a list of busiest cruise ports by passengers. The present list intends to include all cruise ports around the world. The ranking is ordered according to total passenger traffic per year. The statistics represent data reported by the port operator, a government entity, or a news outlet.

Port	Country/territory	Passengers	Year
Port of Helsinki	Finland	9,451,000	2025
Ports of Out Islands	Bahamas	8,965,950	2025
Port Canaveral	United States	8,602,047	2025
Port of Miami	United States	8,564,225	2025
Port of Nassau	Bahamas	6,070,532	2025
Port Everglades	United States	4,773,873	2025
Port of Cozumel	Mexico	4,730,000	2025
Port of Barcelona	Spain	3,655,981	2024
Port of Galveston	United States	3,600,000	2025
Port of Civitavecchia	Italy	3,556,559	2025
Port of Rostock	Germany	3,200,000	2025
Port of Southampton	United Kingdom	3,000,000	2025
Port of Marseille	France	2,543,189	2023
Ports of Balearic Islands	Spain	2,499,141	2024
Port of Mahahual	Mexico	2,400,000	2025
Port of Seattle	United States	1,900,000	2025
Port of Las Palmas	Spain	1,870,999	2024
Port of Shanghai	China	1,857,000	2025
Port of Piraeus	Greece	1,850,000	2025
Port of Singapore	Singapore	1,846,843	2024
Port of Naples	Italy	1,740,000	2024
Port of Juneau	United States	1,688,738	2025
Port of Tampa	United States	1,660,000	2025
Port of Los Angeles	United States	1,617,320	2025
Port of San Juan	Puerto Rico	1,615,039	2025
Port of Genoa	Italy	1,590,000	2024
Port of Saint Thomas and Saint John	United States Virgin Islands	1,553,170	2025
Port of New York and New Jersey	United States	1,537,695	2016
Port of Philipsburg	Sint Maarten	1,597,940	2025
Port of Hamburg	Germany	1,416,715	2025
Port of Roatan	Honduras	1,400,000	2025
Port of Santa Cruz de Tenerife	Spain	1,316,706	2024
Port of Grand Turk Island	Turks and Caicos Islands	1,301,512	2025
Port of Ensenada	Mexico	1,300,000	2025
Port of George Town	Cayman Islands	1,270,981	2023
Port of Mykonos	Greece	1,222,748	2025
Port of Santorini	Greece	1,203,052	2025
Port of Vancouver	Canada	1,200,000	2017
Port of Jeju	South Korea	1,200,000	2017
Port of Taino Bay	Dominican Republic	1,126,485	2025
Port of Cabo San Lucas	Mexico	1,100,000	2025
Port of Amber Cove	Dominican Republic	1,076,149	2025
Port of New Orleans	United States	1,067,407	2025
Penang, Swettenham Pier	Malaysia	1,020,000	2017
Port of Palermo	Italy	975,720	2024
Port Zante	Saint Kitts and Nevis	951,021	2016
Port of Hakata	Japan	950,000	2017
Port of Ketchikan	United States	947,972	2017
Port of Keelung	Taiwan	946,372	2019
Port of Corfu	Greece	894,179	2025
Port of Naha	Japan	888,300	2017
Port of Hong Kong	Hong Kong	875,212	2018
Port of Livorno	Italy	864,118	2024
Port of Bridgetown	Barbados	853,200	2019
Port of Copenhagen	Denmark	840,000	2013
Port of Valletta	Malta	778,596	2017
Port of Valencia	Spain	774,067	2024
Port of Savona	Italy	752,273	2024
Port of Dubrovnik	Croatia	748,918	2017
Port of Bergen	Norway	714,844	2025
Port of Falmouth	Jamaica	713,385	2024
Port of Victoria	Canada	709,042	2019
Port of Cadiz Bay	Spain	696,146	2024
Port of Tallinn	Estonia	635,068	2018
Port of Dubai	United Arab Emirates	625,000	2017
Port of La Spezia	Italy	622,701	2024
Port of Messina	Italy	617,476	2024
Port of Kiel	Germany	598,672	2018
Port of Tunis	Tunisia	560,000	2015
Port of Venice	Italy	547,587	2024
Port of Rhodes	Greece	547,549	2025
Port of Kotor	Montenegro	541,017	2024
Port of Heraklion	Greece	536,543	2025
Port of Madeira	Portugal	540,593	2017
Port of Saint Petersburg	Russia	523,525	2013
Port of Lisbon	Portugal	521,042	2017
Port of Arrecife	Spain	520,192	2024
Port of Tianjin	China	500,000	2016
Port of Palm Beach, Florida	United States	480,000	2016
Port of Malaga	Spain	469,949	2024
Port of Cagliari	Italy	448,661	2024
Port of Progreso	Mexico	413,474	2016
Port of Gibraltar	Gibraltar	404,995	2017
Port of Cartagena de Indias	Colombia	402,848	2024
Port of Boston	United States	402,346	2019
Port of Bari	Italy	397,558	2024
Port of Quebec	Canada	387,678	2017
Port of Buenos Aires	Argentina	374,106	2019
Port of Nouméa	France	351,400	2015
Port of Puerto Vallarta	Mexico	338,153	2016
Port of Amsterdam	Netherlands	332,999	2017
Port of Halifax	Canada	323,709	2019
Port of Ajaccio	France	302,700	2015
Port of Qingdao	China	300,000	2017
Port of Villefranche-sur-Mer	France	296,100	2015
Port of Oslo	Norway	266,000	2022
Port of San Diego	United States	265,000	2024
Port of Toulon	France	239,023	2015
Port of Split	Croatia	232,244	2017
Port of Cartagena	Spain	219,432	2024
Port of Saint John	Canada	208,818	2017
Port of Mazatlan	Mexico	203,227	2016
Port of Casablanca	Morocco	198,140	2013
Port of Portland	United States	172,184	2018
Port of Jacksonville	United States	170,000	2017
Port of Monaco	Monaco	168,017	2017
Port of Liverpool	United Kingdom	122,964	
Port of Gdynia	Poland	90,000	2023

== See also ==
- List of the busiest cruise ports in the Caribbean
