= Port of Santo Domingo =

Port in the city of Santo Domingo, Dominican Republic

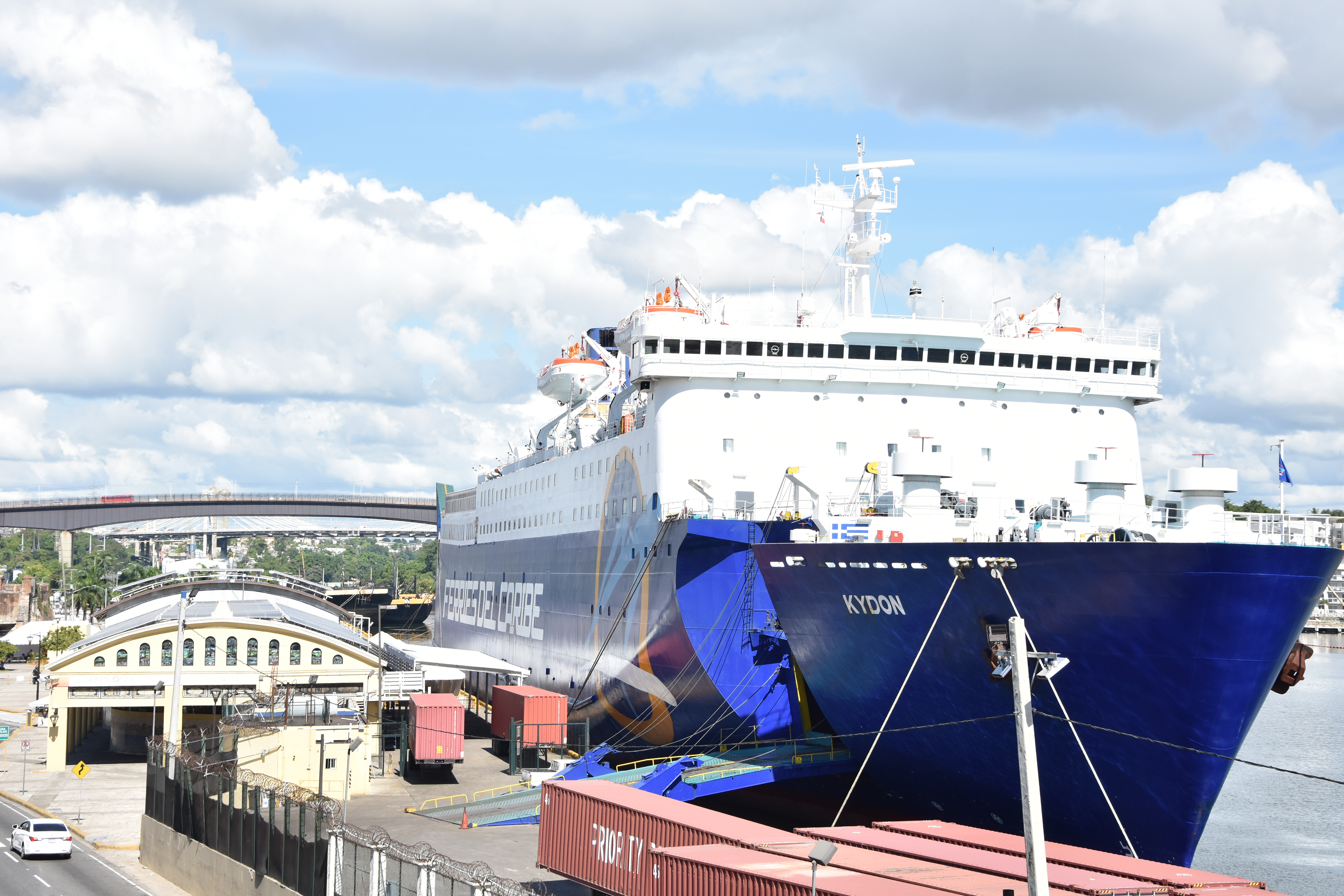
- Interactive map of Port of Santo Domingo

Location
- Country: Dominican Republic
- Location: Santo Domingo
- Coordinates: 18.469°N 69.883°W
- UN/LOCODE: DOSDQ

Details
- Land area: 11,000 m^{2}

Statistics
- Website sansouci.com.do (in Spanish and English)

The Port of Santo Domingo (Spanish: Puerto de Santo Domingo) is a commercial and cruise port located at the mouth of the Ozama River in Santo Domingo, the capital city of the Dominican Republic. Situated next to the Colonial Zone of Santo Domingo, the port is suited for both turnaround and transit visits. It is located about 16 kilometers (9.9 mi) from Haina Occidental Port at the mouth of Haina River, which also serves Santo Domingo.

== Overview ==
The Port of Santo Domingo is being totally renovated as part of a major redevelopment project aimed at integrating the port area and Santo Domingo's Colonial City to create an attractive destination for cruise, yacht and high-end tourism.

The project, supported by legislation approved in 2005, is being developed by a private consortium and includes the construction of new infrastructure: the rehabilitation of the two current terminals, major dredging works in the approach channel and turning basin, a new sports marina and a 122-acre (0.49 km^{2}) real estate development.

The port's rehabilitation started in early 2006, and includes the Don Diego Terminal refurbishment (completed in December 2006) and the building of a new Sans Souci Terminal (completion in early May 2008).

== Port information ==
- Location: 18°28′19″N 69°52′47″W
- Local time: UTC−4
- Climate: mostly sunny, tropical. Hurricane season runs from June to November
- Prevailing winds: From May 15 until September 15, direction ENE–ESE.
- Average temperature range: 28–30 °C.

== Don Diego Terminal ==
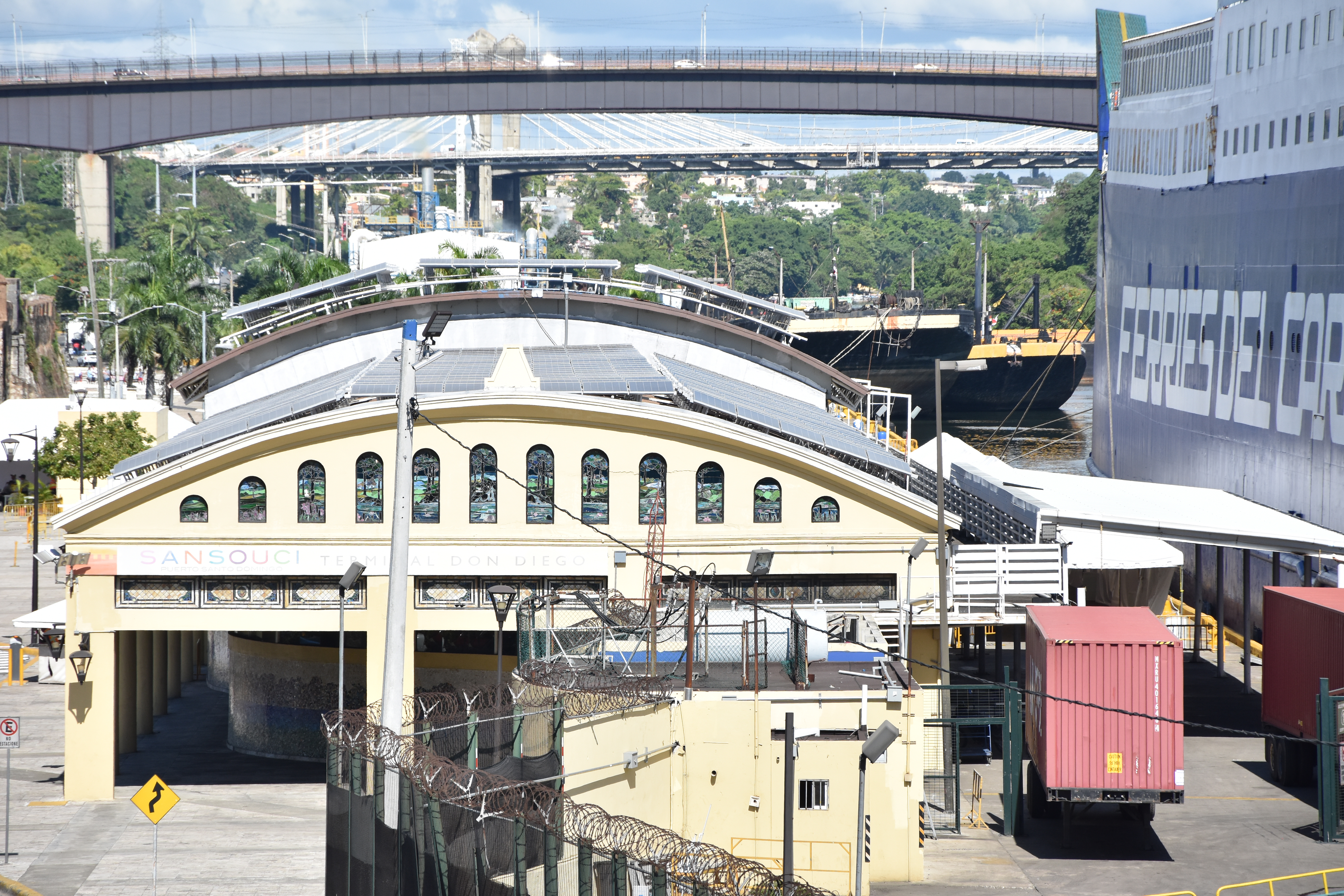
The Don Diego Terminal

The Don Diego Terminal boast a contemporary, functional design, styled to take advantage of natural light and the terminal's easy access to the Colonial City.

The terminal has two cruise reception areas, the North and South wings.

The North Wing, with a surface area of 435 square meters (4,680 sq ft), is used mostly as a transit reception area. Its most distinctive feature is the large marine stained-glass facade. The terminal also has an entrance hall with a stand for information, access to an international and local telecommunications center (phone and internet), currency exchange and restrooms.

The South Wing, which can double as a transit and a homeport terminal has an ample 820-square-meter (8,800 sq ft) hall, which includes modular duty-free stores, check-in facilities and pier access.

The terminal has parking facilities for visitors and a specially designated parking spaces for tourism company buses.

An integral lighting system that includes all the outside and perimeter area of Don Diego Terminal, for greater security and nocturnal visibility to visitors; the pier's perimeter is completely surrounded by an interlocked fence and has a safe circulation area with restricted access. The terminal also has a security surveillance CCTV systems as well as specialized port security personnel.

Don Diego Terminal has ISPS Certification.

The Don Diego Pier specifications are:

- Length of pier: 400 meters (1,300 ft)
- Height of pier AWL: 2.13 meters (7 ft)
- Apron width: 10 meters (33 ft)
- Fenders: panel fenders - 2.1 meters (7 ft) high
- Distance between bollards: 12 meters (39 ft)
- Strength of bollards: 100 tons pull
- Depth of water at low tide: 9.7 meters (32 ft)
- Turning basin max length: 370 meters (1,210 ft)
- Max LOA allowed: 360 meters (1,180 ft)
- Availability of gangway: No
- Distance from pier to city: 0.1 miles.

== Sans Souci Terminal ==
The Sans Souci terminal, is a modern homeport terminal, with open spaces and architectonic relations with the Colonial City. The terminal is able to handle nearly 3,800 passengers plus crew and is able to accommodate todays largest ships (eagle-class or equivalent).

The terminal has the following facilities: a ground level for baggage handling and disembarking; a 3,200-square-meter (34,000 sq ft) mezzanine level which accommodates immigration, duty-free stores, internet center, information stand, bathrooms and other facilities as planned; allowing passengers a view to Sans Souci's ground level, as well, a view to the river, sea, and Colonial City. The second floor is an open 1,200-square-meter (13,000 sq ft) area which is an ample footbridge that crosses all the structure, and houses the gangway for ship access (embarkation/disembarkation).

The terminal also offers other facilities, such as: ample areas for loading and unloading of baggage and containers, accessible parking lots for visitors and tour operator's vehicles, a complete security system: CCTV, x-ray detectors and fire detection.

The Sans Souci Pier specifications are:

- Length of pier: 250 meters (820 ft)
- Height of pier AWL: 2.16 meters (7.1 ft)
- Apron width: 30 meters (98 ft)
- Fenders: foam-filled hanging fenders - 1.5 meters (5 ft) diameter
- Distance between bollards: 5 meters (16 ft)
- Strength of bollards: 100 tons / 2-150 tons
- Depth of water at low tide: 9.7 meters (32 ft)
- Turning basin max length: 370 meters (1,210 ft)
- Max LOA allowed: 360 meters (1,180 ft)
- Availability of gangway: yes, team pax gangway to 3rd floor of terminal
- Distance from pier to city: 1 mile.

== See also ==
- List of ports and harbours of the Atlantic Ocean
