= List of ports and harbours of the Atlantic Ocean =

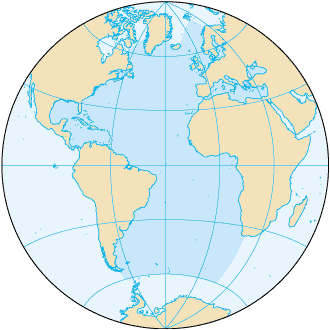
Atlantic Ocean

This is a list of ports and harbours of the Atlantic Ocean, excluding the ports of the Baltic Sea.

For inland ports on rivers, canals, and lakes, including the Great Lakes, Saint Lawrence Seaway, and Mississippi River, see inland port.

Country names follow ISO 3166 (which lists most dependent territories separately).

== List ==
Port	Land region	Country/territory (and subdivision)	Body of water	Coordinates	Features and notes
Accra	Africa	Ghana			
Takoradi	Africa	Ghana			
Banjul	Africa	The Gambia			
Bissau	Africa	Guinea-Bissau			
Conakry	Africa	Guinea			
Dakar	Africa	Senegal			
Douala	Africa	Cameroon	Wouri River		8.5 m (28 ft) draft
Kribi	Africa	Cameroon			16 m (52 ft) draft
Lomé	Africa	Togo			
Luanda	Africa	Angola			
Malabo	Africa	Equatorial Guinea			
Monrovia	Africa	Liberia			
Praia	Africa	Cape Verde			
Walvis Bay	Africa	Namibia			
Freetown	Africa	Sierra Leone			
Cotonou	Africa	Benin			
Porto-Novo	Africa	Benin			
Abidjan	Africa	Côte d'Ivoire			
San-Pédro	Africa	Côte d'Ivoire			
Ile Boulay	Africa	Côte d'Ivoire			
Libreville	Africa	Gabon			
Port Gentil	Africa	Gabon			
Nouadhibou	Africa	Mauritania			
Nouakchott	Africa	Mauritania			
Port of Casablanca	Africa	Morocco			
Rabat	Africa	Morocco			
Tangier	Africa	Morocco			
Lagos	Africa	Nigeria			
Port Harcourt	Africa	Nigeria			
Jamestown	Mid-Atlantic / Africa	Saint Helena, Ascension and Tristan da Cunha			
Georgetown	Mid-Atlantic / Africa	Saint Helena, Ascension and Tristan da Cunha			
Edinburgh of the Seven Seas	Mid-Atlantic / Africa	Saint Helena, Ascension and Tristan da Cunha			
Cape Town	Africa	South Africa			
Port Nolloth	Africa	South Africa			
Saldanha Bay	Africa	South Africa			
Charlottetown	North America	Canada, Prince Edward Island	Gulf of Saint Lawrence	46.24°N 63.14°W	Charlottetown Harbour Authority
Corner Brook	North America	Canada, Newfoundland and Labrador	Bay of Islands	48.967°N 57.95°W	Newfoundland Island
Digby, Nova Scotia	North America	Canada, Nova Scotia	Annapolis Basin		
Halifax	North America	Canada, Nova Scotia		44.65°N 63.567°W	CA rank: 6
Happy Valley-Goose Bay	North America	Canada, Newfoundland and Labrador	Hamilton Inlet	53.302°N 60.417°W	Labrador
Melford (proposed)	North America	Canada, Nova Scotia	Strait of Canso		
Saint John	North America	Canada, New Brunswick	Bay of Fundy	45.307°N 65.978°W	sjport.com; CA rank: 2
Shelburne	North America	Canada, Nova Scotia	Shelburne Harbour		
Sept-Îles	North America	Canada, Quebec	Gulf of Saint Lawrence	50.188°N 66.372°W	portsi.com, CA rank: 3
St. John's	North America	Canada, Newfoundland and Labrador		47.617°N 52.75°W	sjpa.com; Newfoundland Island; CA rank: 17
Sydney	North America	Canada, Nova Scotia	Sydney River	46.138°N 60.183°W	Cape Breton Island
Yarmouth	North America	Canada, Nova Scotia			
Quebec City	North America	Canada, Quebec	Saint Lawrence River		
San Juan, Puerto Rico	Caribbean	Puerto Rico	North Atlantic		
Puerto Cortés	Central America	Honduras	Caribbean Sea	15.883°N 87.95°W	
Willemstad	Caribbean	Curaçao	Caribbean Sea		
Basseterre	Caribbean	Saint Kitts and Nevis	Caribbean Sea		
Limón, Costa Rica	Central America	Costa Rica, Limón Province	Caribbean Sea, Limón coast	9.593°N 83.035°W	japdeva.go.cr
Colon City	Central America	Panama	Caribbean Sea	9.359°N 79.901°W	Panama Canal
Puerto Barrios	Central America	Guatemala	Caribbean Sea, Gulf of Honduras	16.217°N 89°W	
Belize City	Central America	Belize	Caribbean Sea	17.483°N 88.183°W	
Havana	Caribbean	Cuba	Straits of Florida		
Kingston	Caribbean	Jamaica	Caribbean Sea		
Bridgetown	Caribbean	Barbados, Saint Michael	North Atlantic, Carlisle Bay	13.106°N 59.632°W	
Kingstown	Caribbean	St. Vincent			
Tampico	North America	Mexico, Tamaulipas	Gulf of Mexico	22.383°N 97.933°W	puertodetampico.com.mx
Ciudad Madero	North America	Mexico, Tamaulipas			
Río Lagartos	North America	Mexico, Yucatán			
Progreso	North America	Mexico, Yucatán	Gulf of Mexico	21.287°N 89.667°W	6th Mexico, 41st North America
Alvarado	North America	Mexico, Veracruz			
Tamiahua	North America	Mexico, Veracruz			
Barra de Tuxpan	North America	Mexico, Veracruz			
Tecolutla	North America	Mexico, Veracruz			
Tuxpan	North America	Mexico, Veracruz	Gulf of Mexico		2nd Mexico, 19th North America
Anton Lizardo	North America	Mexico, Veracruz			
Veracruz	North America	Mexico, Veracruz	Gulf of Mexico		apiver.com
Coatzacoalcos	North America	Mexico, Veracruz	Gulf of Mexico via Coatzacoalcos River		apicoatza.com
Celestún	North America	Mexico, Yucatán			
Sisal	North America	Mexico, Yucatán			
Dzilam de Bravo	North America	Mexico, Yucatán			
Las Coloradas	North America	Mexico, Yucatán			
Isla Mujeres	North America	Mexico, Quintana Roo			
Cozumel	North America	Mexico, Quintana Roo			
Chetumal	North America	Mexico, Quintana Roo	Caribbean Sea		
Cancún	North America	Mexico, Quintana Roo			
Sánchez Magallanes	North America	Mexico, Tabasco			
Puerto dos Bocas	North America	Mexico, Tabasco	Gulf of Mexico		
Barra Chiltepec	North America	Mexico, Tabasco			
La Barra	North America	Mexico, Tabasco			
Ciudad del Carmen	North America	Mexico, Campeche	Gulf of Mexico, Bay of Campeche		fis.com/campeche
Isla Aguada	North America	Mexico, Campeche			
Champoton	North America	Mexico, Campeche	Gulf of Mexico		
Campeche	North America	Mexico, Campeche			
Port of Albany–Rensselaer	North America	United States, New York	Hudson River	42.628°N 73.757°W	US rank: 63
Alexandra	North America	United States, Virginia			
Apalachicola	North America	United States, Florida			
Augusta	North America	United States, Georgia			
Bainbridge	North America	United States, Georgia			
Baltimore	North America	United States, Maryland	Chesapeake Bay, Patapsco River	39.209°N 76.517°W	Operated by Maryland Port Administration; US rank: 16
Bangor	North America	United States, Maine			
Bath	North America	United States, Maine			
Baton Rouge	North America	United States, Louisiana	Gulf of Mexico		
Baytown	North America	United States, Texas	Gulf of Mexico		
Beaumont	North America	United States, Texas	Gulf of Mexico via Neches River	30.087°N 94.088°W	US rank: 4
Boca Grande	North America	United States, Florida			
Boston	North America	United States, Massachusetts	Massachusetts Bay	42.351°N 71.052°W	US rank: 34
Bridgeport	North America	United States, Connecticut	Long Island Sound	41.172°N 73.179°W	US rank: 78
Brownsville	North America	United States, Texas	Gulf of Mexico via Brownsville Ship Channel	25.952°N 97.398°W	US rank: 77
Brunswick	North America	United States, Georgia	St. Simons Sound	31.159°N 81.5°W	US rank: 94
Bucksport	North America	United States, Maine			
Cambridge	North America	United States, Maryland			
Camden	North America	United States, New Jersey	Delaware River	39.943°N 75.104°W	Owned by the South Jersey Port Corporation; US rank: 70
Port Canaveral	North America	United States, Florida	Banana River	28.414°N 80.608°W	US rank: 93
Carrabelle	North America	United States, Florida			
Charleston	North America	United States, South Carolina	Charleston Harbor	32.789°N 79.922°W	US rank: 38
Columbus	North America	United States, Georgia			
Corpus Christi	North America	United States, Texas	Gulf of Mexico, Corpus Christi Bay	27.813°N 97.398°W	US rank: 5
Fall River	North America	United States, Massachusetts	Taunton River	41.722°N 71.159°W	US rank: 92
Fernandina Beach	North America	United States, Florida			
Freeport	North America	United States, Texas	Gulf of Mexico via Brazos River	28.961°N 95.371°W	US rank: 27
Galveston	North America	United States, Texas	Gulf of Mexico, Galveston Bay	29.31°N 94.813°W	US rank: 40
Georgetown	North America	United States, South Carolina	Winyah Bay	33.367°N 79.29°W	
Gloucester	North America	United States, Massachusetts			
Gulfport	North America	United States, Mississippi	Gulf of Mexico, Mississippi Sound	30.352°N 89.085°W	shipmspa.com ; US rank: 102
Houston	North America	United States, Texas	Gulf of Mexico, Houston Ship Channel	29.748°N 95.291°W	US rank: 2
Jacksonville	North America	United States, Florida	St. Johns River	30.321°N 81.665°W	US rank: 33
Key West	North America	United States, Florida	Gulf of Mexico, Straits of Florida	24.559°N 81.784°W	
Lake Charles	North America	United States, Louisiana	Gulf of Mexico via Calcasieu Ship Channel and Contraband Bayou	30.224°N 93.222°W	US rank: 15
Miami	North America	United States, Florida	Biscayne Bay	25.784°N 80.183°W	US rank: 61
Martha's Vineyard	North America	United States, Massachusetts			
Mobile	North America	United States, Alabama	Gulf of Mexico, Mobile Bay	30.725°N 88.041°W	US rank: 13
Morehead City	North America	United States, North Carolina	Bogue Sound	34.717°N 76.724°W	US rank: 59; North Carolina State Ports Authority
Nantucket	North America	United States, Massachusetts			
New Bedford	North America	United States, Massachusetts	Buzzards Bay	41.652°N 70.934°W	portofnewbedford.org; New Bedford Harbor Development Commission
New Haven	North America	United States, Connecticut	Long Island Sound	41.299°N 72.905°W	US rank: 50
New London	North America	United States, Connecticut	Thames River	41.35°N 72.106°W	
New Orleans	North America	United States, Louisiana	Gulf of Mexico		
Port of New York and New Jersey	North America	United States, New York and New Jersey		40.674°N 74.038°W	Includes Port Newark–Elizabeth Marine Terminal US rank: 3
Newport	North America	United States, Rhode Island			
Port of Virginia	North America	United States, Virginia	Chesapeake Bay via Hampton Roads	36.947°N 76.33°W	US rank: 8; includes Norfolk International Terminals, Portsmouth Marine Terminal, Newport News Marine Terminal, and Virginia International Gateway (VIG) at Portsmouth
Orange	North America	United States, Texas	Gulf of Mexico via Sabine River	30.098°N 93.721°W	portoforange.com
Palm Beach	North America	United States, Florida	Lake Worth Lagoon	26.769°N 80.053°W	US rank: 97
Panama City	North America	United States, Florida	Gulf of Mexico, St. Andrew Bay	30.19°N 84.199°W	US rank: 87
Pascagoula	North America	United States, Mississippi	Gulf of Mexico, Pascagoula Bay	30.348°N 88.559°W	portofpascagoula.com; US rank: 17
Pensacola	North America	United States, Florida	Gulf of Mexico, Pensacola Bay	30.408°N 87.258°W	US rank: 144
Philadelphia	North America	United States, Pennsylvania	Delaware River	39.919°N 75.202°W	US rank: 21
Plymouth	North America	United States, Massachusetts			
Port Arthur	North America	United States, Texas	Gulf of Mexico via Sabine River	29.831°N 93.961°W	US rank: 25
Port Everglades	North America	United States, Florida		26.093°N 80.118°W	
Port of Port Lavaca – Point Comfort	North America	United States, Texas	Gulf of Mexico, Lavaca Bay	28.635°N 96.619°W	US rank: 53
Port Royal	North America	United States, South Carolina			
Port Sulphur	North America	United States, Louisiana	Gulf of Mexico		
Portland	North America	United States, Maine	Casco Bay	43.65°N 70.251°W	US rank: 37
Port of New Hampshire	North America	United States, New Hampshire	Piscataqua River, Portsmouth Harbor	43.074°N 70.738°W	DPH Market Street Marine Terminal located in Portsmouth, New Hampshire; also oversees marinas in Rye Harbor and Hampton Harbor; US rank: 85
Providence	North America	United States, Rhode Island	Narragansett Bay	41.812°N 71.398°W	provport.com; US rank: 60
Provincetown	North America	United States, Massachusetts			
Richmond	North America	United States, Virginia	James River	37.457°N 77.419°W	US rank: 142
Sabine	North America	United States, Texas	Gulf of Mexico		
Saint Petersburg	North America	United States, Florida			
Savannah	North America	United States, Georgia	Savannah River	32.085°N 81.095°W	US rank: 19
Searsport	North America	United States, Maine	Penobscot Bay	44.453°N 68.925°W	US rank: 106
Port of South Louisiana	North America	United States, Louisiana	Mississippi River	30.033°N 90.618°W	US rank: 1
Port Tampa Bay	North America	United States, Florida	Gulf of Mexico, Tampa Bay	27.785°N 82.522°W	US rank: 20
Texas City	North America	United States, Texas	Gulf of Mexico, Galveston Bay	29.363°N 94.918°W	US rank: 11
Trenton	North America	United States, New Jersey			
Washington, DC	North America	United States, District of Columbia			
Wilmington, Delaware	North America	United States, Delaware	Delaware River	39.716°N 75.507°W	US rank: 97
Wilmington, North Carolina	North America	United States, North Carolina	Cape Fear River	34.239°N 77.954°W	North Carolina State Ports Authority; US rank: 72
Comodoro Rivadavia	South America	Argentina			
Ushuaia	South America	Argentina	Beagle Channel		
Buenos Aires	South America	Argentina	Río de la Plata		
Bahía Blanca	South America	Argentina	Bahía Blanca		
Mar del Plata	South America	Argentina			
Río Gallegos	South America	Argentina	Gallegos River		
Macapá	South America	Brazil, Amapá	Amazon River		
Santarém	South America	Brazil, Pará	Amazon River		
Belém	South America	Brazil, Pará	Amazon River - Pará arm		
Vila do Conde	South America	Brazil, Pará	Amazon River - Pará arm		
Itaqui	South America	Brazil, Maranhão	Uruguay River		
Pecém	South America	Brazil, Ceará			
Fortaleza	South America	Brazil, Ceará			
Areia Branca	South America	Brazil, Rio Grande do Norte			
Natal	South America	Brazil, Rio Grande do Norte			
Cabedelo	South America	Brazil, Paraíba			
Recife	South America	Brazil, Pernambuco			
Suape	South America	Brazil, Pernambuco			
Maceió	South America	Brazil, Alagoas			
Barra dos Coqueiros	South America	Brazil, Sergipe			
Salvador	South America	Brazil, Bahia			
Aratu	South America	Brazil, Bahia			
Vitória	South America	Brazil, Espírito Santo			
Ubu	South America	Brazil, Espírito Santo			
Tubarão	South America	Brazil, Espírito Santo			
TVV	South America	Brazil, Espírito Santo			
Praia Mole	South America	Brazil, Espírito Santo			
Regência	South America	Brazil, Espírito Santo			
Barra do Riacho	South America	Brazil, Espírito Santo			
Macaé (Imbetiba)	South America	Brazil, Rio de Janeiro			
Niterói	South America	Brazil, Rio de Janeiro			
Rio de Janeiro	South America	Brazil, Rio de Janeiro	Guanabara Bay		
Itaguaí (Sepetiba)	South America	Brazil, Rio de Janeiro			
Angra dos Reis	South America	Brazil, Rio de Janeiro			
São Sebastião	South America	Brazil, São Paulo			
Santos	South America	Brazil, São Paulo			
Antonina	South America	Brazil, Paraná			
Paranaguá	South America	Brazil, Paraná			
São Francisco do Sul	South America	Brazil, Santa Catarina			
Itajaí	South America	Brazil, Santa Catarina			
Imbituba	South America	Brazil, Santa Catarina			
Laguna	South America	Brazil, Santa Catarina			
Rio Grande	South America	Brazil, Rio Grande do Sul			
Puerto Toro	South America	Chile, Magallanes & the Chilean Antarctica			
Barranquilla	South America	Colombia, Atlántico			
Cartagena	South America	Colombia, Bolívar	Caribbean Sea		
Santa Marta	South America	Colombia, Magdalena			
Riohacha	South America	Colombia, La Guajira			
Turbo	South America	Colombia, Antioquia			
Stanley	South America	Falkland Islands			
Mare Harbour	South America	Falkland Islands			
Berkeley Sound	South America	Falkland Islands			
Fox Bay	South America	Falkland Islands			
Weddell Settlement	South America	Falkland Islands			
Cayenne	South America / European Union	French Guiana			
Georgetown	South America	Guyana			
Grytviken	Mid-Atlantic / South America	South Georgia and the South Sandwich Islands			
King Edward Point	Mid-Atlantic / South America	South Georgia and the South Sandwich Islands			
Paramaribo	South America	Suriname			
Carmelo	South America	Uruguay			
Colonia del Sacramento	South America	Uruguay			
La Paloma	South America	Uruguay, Rocha			
Montevideo	South America	Uruguay			
Piriapolis	South America	Uruguay			
Punta del Este	South America	Uruguay			
Ciudad Bolívar	South America	Venezuela, Bolívar	Orinoco River		
Guanta	South America	Venezuela, Anzoátegui	Caribbean Sea		
La Guaira	South America	Venezuela, Vargas	Caribbean Sea		
Maracaibo	South America	Venezuela, Zulia	Caribbean Sea		
Porlamar (Isla Margarita)	South America	Venezuela, Nueva Esparta	Caribbean Sea		
Puerto Cabello	South America	Venezuela, Carabobo	Caribbean Sea		
Ostend (Oostende)	Europe	Belgium	North Sea		
Las Palmas de Gran Canaria	Africa / European Union	Canary Islands			
Santa Cruz de Tenerife	Africa / European Union	Canary Islands			
Tallinn	Europe	Estonia			
Klaksvík	Mid-Atlantic / Europe	Faroe Islands			
Tórshavn	Mid-Atlantic / Europe	Faroe Islands			
Bayonne	Europe	France	Bay of Biscay		
Bordeaux	Europe	France	Bay of Biscay		
Boulogne-sur-Mer	Europe	France	Bay of Biscay		
Brest	Europe	France			
Calais	Europe	France			
Cherbourg-Octeville	Europe	France			
Concarneau	Europe	France			
Dieppe	Europe	France			
Dunkirk	Europe	France			
La Rochelle	Europe	France	Bay of Biscay		
Le Havre	Europe	France			
Les Sables-d'Olonne	Europe	France	Bay of Biscay		
Lorient	Europe	France			
Nantes	Europe	France			
Saint-Brieuc	Europe	France			
Saint-Malo	Europe	France			
Saint-Nazaire	Europe	France			
Kiel	Europe	Germany			
Rostock	Europe	Germany			
Hafnarfjörður	Mid-Atlantic / Europe	Iceland			
Reykjavík	Mid-Atlantic / Europe	Iceland			
Cork	Europe	Ireland			
Dublin Port	Europe	Ireland	Irish Sea		
Galway	Europe	Ireland			
Killybegs	Europe	Ireland			
Limerick	Europe	Ireland			
Shannon Foynes Port	Europe	Ireland			
Rosslare Europort	Europe	Ireland			
IJmuiden	Europe	Netherlands			
The Hague	Europe	Netherlands			
Den Helder	Europe	Netherlands			
Bergen	Europe	Norway			
Bodø	Europe	Norway			
Brønnøysund	Europe	Norway			
Florø	Europe	Norway			
Harstad	Europe	Norway			
Haugesund	Europe	Norway			
Kristiansund	Europe	Norway	North Sea		
Molde	Europe	Norway			
Namsos	Europe	Norway			
Narvik	Europe	Norway			
Rørvik	Europe	Norway			
Svolvær	Europe	Norway			
Tromsø	Europe	Norway			
Trondheim	Europe	Norway			
Angra do Heroísmo	Europe	Portugal			
Aveiro	Europe	Portugal			
Cascais	Europe	Portugal			
Figueira da Foz	Europe	Portugal			
Funchal	Europe	Portugal			
Horta	Europe	Portugal			
Lisbon	Europe	Portugal			
Lagos	Europe	Portugal			
Leixões	Europe	Portugal			
Nazaré	Europe	Portugal			
Olhão	Europe	Portugal			
Peniche	Europe	Portugal			
Ponta Delgada	Europe	Portugal			
Portimão	Europe	Portugal			
Porto	Europe	Portugal	Atlantic Ocean		
Santa Cruz das Flores	Europe	Portugal			
Sesimbra	Europe	Portugal	Atlantic Ocean		
Setúbal	Europe	Portugal	Atlantic Ocean		
Sines	Europe	Portugal	Atlantic Ocean		
Tavira	Europe	Portugal	Atlantic Ocean		
Viana do Castelo	Europe	Portugal	Atlantic Ocean		
Vila do Porto	Europe	Portugal			
Vila Real de Santo António	Europe	Portugal			
St. Petersburg	Europe	Russia			
A Coruña	Europe	Spain			
Avilés	Europe	Spain	Bay of Biscay		
Bilbao	Europe	Spain	Bay of Biscay		
Cádiz	Europe	Spain			
Ferrol	Europe	Spain			
Gijón	Europe	Spain			
Huelva	Europe	Spain			
Marín	Europe	Spain			
Las Palmas de Gran Canaria	Europe	Spain			
Pasaia	Europe	Spain	Bay of Biscay		
El Puerto de Santa María	Europe	Spain			
Seville	Europe	Spain			
Santa Cruz de Tenerife	Europe	Spain			
Santander	Europe	Spain	Bay of Biscay		
Vigo	Europe	Spain			Largest fishing port in the world
Vilagarcía de Arousa	Europe	Spain			
Barry	Europe	United Kingdom, Wales			
Belfast	Europe	United Kingdom, Northern Ireland	Irish Sea		
Bootle	Europe	United Kingdom, England			
Cardiff	Europe	United Kingdom, Wales	Irish Sea		
Derry	Europe	United Kingdom, Northern Ireland			
Dover	Europe	United Kingdom, England	English Channel		The Port of Dover is one of the world's busiest maritime passenger ports
Fishguard Harbour (Goodwick)	Europe	United Kingdom, Wales	Irish Sea		
Fleetwood	Europe	United Kingdom, England	Irish Sea		
Glasgow	Europe	United Kingdom, Scotland			
Greenock	Europe	United Kingdom, Scotland			
Inverness	Europe	United Kingdom, Scotland			
Holyhead	Europe	United Kingdom, Wales	Irish Sea		
Larne	Europe	United Kingdom, Northern Ireland	Irish Sea		
Liverpool	Europe	United Kingdom, England	Irish Sea		
London	Europe	United Kingdom, England	North Sea		
Milford Haven Waterway	Europe	United Kingdom, Wales	Bristol Channel		
Newport	Europe	United Kingdom, Wales	Bristol Channel		
Pembroke Dock	Europe	United Kingdom, Wales	Bristol Channel		
Peterhead	Europe	United Kingdom, Scotland	North Sea		
Plymouth	Europe	United Kingdom, England	English Channel		
Poole	Europe	United Kingdom, England	English Channel		The Port of Poole
Portsmouth	Europe	United Kingdom, England	English Channel		HMNB Portsmouth
Port Talbot	Europe	United Kingdom, Wales	Bristol Channel		
Southampton	Europe	United Kingdom, England	English Channel		
Stranraer	Europe	United Kingdom, Scotland	Irish Sea		
Swansea	Europe	United Kingdom, Wales	Bristol Channel		
Banana	Africa	Democratic Republic of the Congo			
Bayonne	North America	United States, New Jersey			
Botwood	North America	Canada, Newfoundland and Labrador	Bay of Exploits		
Bristol Port	Europe	United Kingdom, England			
Brunswick	North America	United States, Georgia			
Calabar	Africa	Nigeria			
Cabinda	Africa	Angola			
Cape May	North America	United States, New Jersey			
Port Elizabeth	North America	United States, New Jersey			
Freeport	Caribbean	Bahamas			
Hamilton	Mid-Atlantic / North America	Bermuda			
Nassau	Caribbean	Bahamas			
Necochea	South America	Argentina			
Punta Alta	South America	Argentina	Bahía Blanca		
St. Augustine	North America	United States, Florida			
Setúbal	Europe	Portugal			
Stornoway	Europe	United Kingdom, Scotland			
Itapoá	South America	Brazil, Santa Catarina			
Burela	Europe	Spain	Bay of Biscay		
El Musel	Europe	Spain, Gijón	Bay of Biscay		
La Rochelle	Europe	France	Bay of Biscay		
Santander	Europe	Spain, Cantabria	Bay of Biscay		
Basse-Terre	Caribbean	Guadeloupe	Caribbean Sea		
Port of Cabo Rojo	Caribbean	Dominican Republic	Caribbean Sea		
Fort-de-France	Caribbean	Martinique	Caribbean Sea		
Caimanera	Caribbean	Cuba, Guantánamo Province	Caribbean Sea		
Oranjestad	Caribbean	Aruba	Caribbean Sea		
Pointe-à-Pitre	Caribbean	Guadeloupe	Caribbean Sea		
Ponce	Caribbean	Puerto Rico	Caribbean Sea		
Port-au-Prince	Caribbean	Haiti	Caribbean Sea		
Port of Spain	Caribbean	Trinidad and Tobago	Caribbean Sea		
Port of Puerto Plata	Caribbean	Dominican Republic	Caribbean Sea		
Puerto Castilla	Caribbean	Honduras	Caribbean Sea		
Roatán	Caribbean	Honduras	Caribbean Sea		
Santiago de Cuba	Caribbean	Cuba	Caribbean Sea		
Santo Tomás de Castilla	Caribbean	Guatemala	Caribbean Sea		
Pedernales	South America	Venezuela	Gulf of Paria		
Point Lisas	Caribbean	Trinidad and Tobago	Gulf of Paria		
Scarborough	Caribbean	Trinidad and Tobago	Gulf of Paria		
Civitavecchia	Europe	Italy	Mediterranean Sea, Tyrrhenian Sea		
Naples	Europe	Italy	Mediterranean Sea, Tyrrhenian Sea		
Livorno	Europe	Italy	Mediterranean Sea, Tyrrhenian Sea		
Copenhagen	Europe	Denmark	Øresund		
Helsingborg	Europe	Sweden	Øresund		
Malmö	Europe	Sweden	Øresund		
Bécancour	North America	Canada, Quebec	Saint Lawrence River		
Ancona	Europe	Italy	Mediterranean Sea, Adriatic Sea		
Port of Bar	Europe	Montenegro	Mediterranean Sea, Adriatic Sea		
Bari	Europe	Italy	Mediterranean Sea, Adriatic Sea		
Budva	Europe	Montenegro	Mediterranean Sea, Adriatic Sea		
Port of Durrës	Europe	Albania	Mediterranean Sea, Adriatic Sea	41°18'29.0"N 19°27'17.3"E	
Port of Koper	Europe	Slovenia	Mediterranean Sea, Adriatic Sea		
Port of Pescara	Europe	Italy	Mediterranean Sea, Adriatic Sea		
Port of Ploče	Europe	Croatia	Mediterranean Sea, Adriatic Sea		
Port of Rijeka	Europe	Croatia	Mediterranean Sea, Adriatic Sea		
Shën Gjin	Europe	Albania	Mediterranean Sea, Adriatic Sea		
Port of Split	Europe	Croatia	Mediterranean Sea, Adriatic Sea		
Port of Trieste	Europe	Italy	Mediterranean Sea, Adriatic Sea		
Venice	Europe	Italy	Mediterranean Sea, Adriatic Sea		
Port of Vlorë	Europe	Albania	Mediterranean Sea, Adriatic Sea		
Ravenna	Europe	Italy	Mediterranean Sea, Adriatic Sea		
Monfalcone	Europe	Italy	Mediterranean Sea, Adriatic Sea		
Chioggia	Europe	Italy	Mediterranean Sea, Adriatic Sea		
Porto Marghera	Europe	Italy	Mediterranean Sea, Adriatic Sea		
Alexandroupolis	Europe	Greece	Mediterranean Sea, Aegean Sea		
Bodrum	West Asia	Turkey	Mediterranean Sea, Aegean Sea		
Chalcis	Europe	Greece	Mediterranean Sea, Aegean Sea		
Chios	Europe	Greece	Mediterranean Sea, Aegean Sea		
Eleusina	Europe	Greece	Mediterranean Sea, Aegean Sea		
Heraklion	Europe	Greece, Crete	Mediterranean Sea, Aegean Sea		
İzmir	West Asia	Turkey	Mediterranean Sea, Aegean Sea		
Kavala	Europe	Greece	Mediterranean Sea, Aegean Sea		
Kuşadası	West Asia	Turkey	Mediterranean Sea, Aegean Sea		
Laurium	Europe	Greece	Mediterranean Sea, Aegean Sea		
Mytilene	Europe	Greece	Mediterranean Sea, Aegean Sea		
Rhodes	Europe	Greece	Mediterranean Sea, Aegean Sea		
Thessaloniki	Europe	Greece	Mediterranean Sea, Aegean Sea		
Volos	Europe	Greece	Mediterranean Sea, Aegean Sea		
Azov	Europe	Russia	Black Sea, Sea of Azov		
Berdiansk	Europe	Ukraine	Black Sea, Sea of Azov		
Mariupol	Europe	Ukraine	Black Sea, Sea of Azov		
Taganrog	Europe	Russia	Black Sea, Sea of Azov		
Yeysk	Europe	Russia	Black Sea, Sea of Azov		
Batumi	West Asia	Georgia	Black Sea		
Bilhorod	Europe	Ukraine	Black Sea		
Port of Burgas	Europe	Bulgaria	Gulf of Burgas		
Chornomorsk	Europe	Ukraine	Black Sea		
Mangalia	Europe	Romania	Black Sea		
Midia, Năvodari	Europe	Romania	Black Sea		
Novorossiysk	Europe	Russia	Black Sea		
Odesa	Europe	Ukraine	Black Sea		
Poti	West Asia	Georgia	Black Sea		
Port of Constanţa	Europe	Romania	Black Sea		
Port of Erdemir	West Asia	Turkey	Black Sea		
Port of Varna	Europe	Bulgaria	Black Sea		
Samsun	West Asia	Turkey	Black Sea		
Sevastopol	Europe	Ukraine	Black Sea		
Sokhumi	West Asia	Georgia	Black Sea		
Trabzon	West Asia	Turkey	Black Sea		
Yalta	Europe	Ukraine	Black Sea		
Pivdenne	Europe	Ukraine	Black Sea		
Caen (Ouistreham)	Europe	France	English Channel		
Calais	Europe	France	English Channel		
Cherbourg	Europe	France	English Channel		
Dieppe	Europe	France	English Channel		
Port of Dover	Europe	United Kingdom, England	English Channel		
Falmouth	Europe	United Kingdom, England	English Channel		
Le Havre	Europe	France	English Channel		
Port of London	Europe	United Kingdom, England	English Channel		
Dunkirk	Europe	France	English Channel		
Newhaven	Europe	United Kingdom, England	English Channel		
St. Peter Port	Europe	Guernsey	English Channel		
Portland Harbour	Europe	United Kingdom, England	English Channel		
Portsmouth	Europe	United Kingdom, England	English Channel		
Plymouth	Europe	United Kingdom, England	English Channel		
Ramsgate	Europe	United Kingdom, England	English Channel		
Saint-Malo	Europe	France	English Channel		
Shoreham-by-Sea	Europe	United Kingdom, England	English Channel		
Port of Southampton	Europe	United Kingdom, England	English Channel		
Teignmouth	Europe	United Kingdom, England	English Channel		
Barrow-in-Furness	Europe	United Kingdom, England	Irish Sea		
Caernarfon	Europe	United Kingdom, Wales	Irish Sea		
Cairnryan	Europe	United Kingdom, Scotland	Irish Sea		
Douglas	Europe	Isle of Man	Irish Sea		
Drogheda	Europe	Ireland	Irish Sea		
Dún Laoghaire	Europe	Ireland	Irish Sea		
Dundalk	Europe	Ireland	Irish Sea		
Ellesmere	Europe	England	Irish Sea		
Garston	Europe	United Kingdom, England	Irish Sea		
Heysham	Europe	United Kingdom, England	Irish Sea		
Milford Haven	Europe	United Kingdom, Wales	Irish Sea		
Mostyn	Europe	United Kingdom, Wales	Irish Sea		
Pembroke Dock	Europe	United Kingdom, Wales	Irish Sea		
Rosslare Europort	Europe	Ireland	Irish Sea		
Runcorn	Europe	England	Irish Sea		
Port Penrhyn	Europe	United Kingdom, Wales	Irish Sea		
Istanbul	Europe & West Asia	Turkey	Sea of Marmara		
İzmit	West Asia	Turkey	Sea of Marmara		
Tekirdağ	Europe	Turkey	Sea of Marmara		
Adana	West Asia	Turkey	Mediterranean Sea, Cilician Sea		
Alexandria	Africa	Egypt	Mediterranean Sea, Levantine Sea		
Algeciras	Europe	Spain	Mediterranean Sea, Strait of Gibraltar		
Al Hoceima	Africa	Morocco	Mediterranean Sea, Alboran Sea		
Algiers	Africa	Algeria	Mediterranean Sea, Bay of Algiers		
Almería	Europe	Spain	Mediterranean Sea, Alboran Sea		
Antalya	West Asia	Turkey	Mediterranean Sea, Gulf of Antalya		
Port of Ashdod	West Asia	Israel	Mediterranean Sea, Levantine Sea		
Barcelona	Europe	Spain	Mediterranean Sea, Balearic Sea		
Bardia	Africa	Libya	Mediterranean Sea, Libyan Sea		
Beirut	West Asia	Lebanon	Mediterranean Sea, Levantine Sea		
Benghazi	Africa	Libya	Mediterranean Sea, Gulf of Sidra		
Cagliari	Europe	Italy, Sardinia	Mediterranean Sea		
Cartagena	Europe	Spain	Mediterranean Sea		
Ceuta	Africa	Spain	Mediterranean Sea, Alboran Sea		
Corinth	Europe	Greece	Mediterranean Sea, Ionian Sea, Gulf of Corinth		
Datça	West Asia	Turkey	Mediterranean Sea, Aegean Sea		
Fethiye	West Asia	Turkey	Mediterranean Sea, Levantine Sea, Gulf of Fethiye		
Genoa	Europe	Italy	Mediterranean Sea, Ligurian Sea		
Gibraltar	Europe	Gibraltar	Mediterranean Sea, Strait of Gibraltar		
Gioia Tauro	Europe	Italy	Mediterranean Sea, Tyrrhenian Sea		
Grand Harbour	Europe	Malta	Mediterranean Sea		
Iskenderun	West Asia	Turkey	Mediterranean Sea, Cilician Sea		
Port of Haifa	West Asia	Israel	Mediterranean Sea, Levantine Sea		
Larnaca	West Asia / European Union	Cyprus	Mediterranean Sea, Levantine Sea, Larnaca Bay		
Latakia	West Asia	Syria	Mediterranean Sea, Levantine Sea		
Limassol	West Asia / European Union	Cyprus	Mediterranean Sea, Levantine Sea, Limassol Bay		
Málaga	Europe	Spain	Mediterranean Sea, Alboran Sea		
Marmaris	West Asia	Turkey	Mediterranean Sea		
Marseille	Europe	France	Mediterranean Sea, Gulf of Lion		
Melilla	Africa	Spain	Mediterranean Sea, Alboran Sea		
Mersa Matruh	Africa	Egypt	Mediterranean Sea, Levantine Sea		
Mersin	West Asia	Turkey	Mediterranean Sea, Cilician Sea		
Messina	Europe	Italy, Sicily	Mediterranean Sea, Strait of Messina		
Misrata	Africa	Libya	Mediterranean Sea		
Nador	Africa	Morocco	Mediterranean Sea, Alboran Sea		
Palma de Mallorca	Europe	Spain	Mediterranean Sea, Balearic Sea, Palma Bay		
Palermo	Europe	Sicily, Italy	Mediterranean Sea, Tyrrhenian Sea		
Patras	Europe	Greece	Mediterranean Sea, Ionian Sea, Gulf of Patras		
Piombino	Europe	Italy	Mediterranean Sea, Tyrrhenian Sea		
Piraeus	Europe	Greece	Mediterranean Sea, Aegean Sea, Myrtoan Sea		
Port Said	Africa	Egypt	Mediterranean Sea, Levantine Sea		Suez Canal
Sidon	West Asia	Lebanon	Mediterranean Sea, Levantine Sea		
Tangier	Africa	Morocco	Mediterranean Sea, Strait of Gibraltar		
Tarragona	Europe	Spain	Mediterranean Sea, Balearic Sea		
Tel Aviv	West Asia	Israel	Mediterranean Sea, Levantine Sea		
Tétouan	Africa	Morocco	Mediterranean Sea, Alboran Sea		
Tripoli	West Asia	Lebanon	Mediterranean Sea		
Tripoli	Africa	Libya	Mediterranean Sea		
Tunis	Africa	Tunisia	Mediterranean Sea, Gulf of Tunis		
Valencia	Europe	Spain	Mediterranean Sea		
Wahran	Africa	Algeria	Mediterranean Sea		
Aberdeen	Europe	United Kingdom, Scotland	North Sea		
Port of Amsterdam	Europe	Netherlands	North Sea		
Port of Antwerp	Europe	Belgium	North Sea		
Blyth	Europe	United Kingdom, England	North Sea		
Bremerhaven	Europe	Germany	North Sea		
Bremen	Europe	Germany	North Sea		
Port of Bruges-Zeebrugge	Europe	Belgium	North Sea		
Cuxhaven	Europe	Germany	North Sea		
Delfzijl	Europe	Netherlands	North Sea		
Dundee	Europe	United Kingdom, Scotland	North Sea		
Eemshaven	Europe	Netherlands	North Sea		
Emden	Europe	Germany	North Sea		
Esbjerg	Europe	Denmark	North Sea		
Port of Felixstowe	Europe	United Kingdom, England	North Sea		
Flotta	Europe	United Kingdom, Scotland	North Sea		
Port of Ghent	Europe	Belgium	Ghent–Terneuzen Canal		
Gothenburg	Europe	Sweden	North Sea		
Grimsby	Europe	United Kingdom, England	North Sea		
Port of Hamburg	Europe	Germany	North Sea		
Harwich International Port	Europe	United Kingdom, England	North Sea		
Immingham	Europe	United Kingdom, England	North Sea		
Hull	Europe	United Kingdom, England	North Sea		
Kristiansand	Europe	Norway	North Sea		
Leith	Europe	United Kingdom, Scotland	North Sea		
Middlesbrough	Europe	United Kingdom, England	North Sea		
Newcastle	Europe	United Kingdom, England	North Sea		
Oslo	Europe	Norway	North Sea		
Port of Rotterdam	Europe	Netherlands	North Sea		Includes Europoort
Stavanger	Europe	Norway	North Sea		
Terneuzen	Europe	Netherlands	North Sea		
The Hague	Europe	Netherlands	North Sea		
Sullom Voe	Europe	United Kingdom, Scotland	North Sea		
Sunderland	Europe	United Kingdom, England	North Sea		
Thamesport	Europe	United Kingdom, England	North Sea		
Port of Tilbury	Europe	United Kingdom, England	North Sea		
Vlissingen	Europe	Netherlands	North Sea		
Wilhelmshaven	Europe	Germany	North Sea		Includes JadeWeserPort
Ålesund	Europe	Norway	North Sea		
Matamoros	North America	Mexico, Tamaulipas	Gulf of Mexico		
Matanzas	Caribbean	Cuba, Matanzas	Gulf of Mexico		
Belledune	North America	Canada, New Brunswick	Chaleur Bay	47.91°N 65.84°W	CA rank: 13
Shediac	North America	Canada, New Brunswick	Northumberland Strait	46.217°N 64.533°W	
Eastport	North America	United States, Maine	Friar Roads	44.914°N 67.004°W	portofeastport.org
Stamford	North America	United States, Connecticut	Long Island Sound	41.097°N 73.553°W	
Port Jefferson	North America	United States, New York	Long Island Sound	40.949°N 73.072°W	US rank: 129
Hempstead Harbor	North America	United States, New York	Long Island Sound	40.874°N 73.673°W	US rank: 141
Penn Manor	North America	United States, Pennsylvania	Delaware River	40.136°N 74.741°W	
Chester	North America	United States, Pennsylvania	Delaware River	39.854°N 75.322°W	US rank: 119
Port of Paulsboro	North America	United States, New Jersey	Delaware River/Mantua Creek	39.827°N 75.227°W	US rank: 39; Paulsboro Marine Terminal - Owned by the South Jersey Port Corporation
Marcus Hook	North America	United States, Pennsylvania	Delaware River	39.815°N 75.404°W	US rank: 31
Salem	North America	United States, New Jersey	Delaware River/Salem River		Nearby Salem Marine Terminal and Millville Airport also owned by the South Jersey Port Corporation
New Castle	North America	United States, Delaware	Delaware River	39.657°N 75.562°W	US rank: 114
Salisbury	North America	United States, Maryland	Chesapeake Bay, Wicomico River	38.366°N 75.593°W	
Hopewell	North America	United States, Virginia	James River	37.29°N 77.303°W	
Puerto Juárez	North America	Mexico, Quintana Roo, Cancún	Caribbean Sea	19.583°N 88.05°W	apiqroo.com.mx
Santo Domingo	Caribbean	Dominican Republic	Caribbean Sea	18.469°N 69.883°W	
Bluefields	Central America	Nicaragua	Caribbean Sea	12°N 83.75°W	
Weedon Island	North America	United States, Florida	Gulf of Mexico, Tampa Bay	27.859°N 82.597°W	
Port Manatee	North America	United States, Florida	Gulf of Mexico, Tampa Bay	27.66°N 82.603°W	portmanatee.com; US rank: 82
Biloxi	North America	United States, Mississippi	Gulf of Mexico, Biloxi Bay	30.419°N 88.887°W	US rank: 84
Plaquemines Port	North America	United States, Louisiana	Mississippi River	29.48°N 89.687°W	US rank: 12
Louisiana Offshore Oil Port	North America	United States, Louisiana	Gulf of Mexico	28.655°N 89.901°W	
St. Bernard	North America	United States, Louisiana	Mississippi River	29.943°N 89.981°W	stbernardport.com ; St. Bernard Port, Harbor & Terminal District
Port Fourchon	North America	United States, Louisiana	Gulf of Mexico, Bayou Lafourche	29.127°N 90.215°W	
Iberia District	North America	United States, Louisiana	Gulf of Mexico, Bayou Teche	30.004°N 91.818°W	
Intracoastal City	North America	United States, Louisiana	Gulf of Mexico, Vermilion River	29.784°N 92.339°W	
Matagorda Ship Channel	North America	United States, Texas	Gulf of Mexico, Matagorda Bay	28.435002°N 96.335528°W	
Victoria	North America	United States, Texas	Gulf of Mexico via Victoria Barge Canal (Guadalupe River)	28.691°N 96.972°W	US rank: 88
Altamira	North America	Mexico, Tamaulipas	Gulf of Mexico	22.383°N 97.933°W	puertoaltamira.com.mx; 3rd Mexico, 23rd North America

== See also ==
- Channel Ports (English Channel)
- List of coastal settlements of the Mediterranean Sea
- List of busiest cruise ports by passengers
- Ports of the Baltic Sea
- List of North Sea ports

== Notes ==
- North America Port Container Traffic 2006 Port Ranking by TEUs.
- Canadian rankings from Transport Canada.
- World rankings from American Association of Port Authorities.
- U.S. rankings from American Association of Port Authorities.
- Local ports are included.
- Seasonal ports are included.
- Cruise ship ports are included.
- Fishing ports are included.
- Drydocks are noted.
- Some ports are part of the Dubai Ports World controversy.
