= George L. Viavant =

American painter

George L. Viavant (1872–1925) was a Louisiana artist who was inspired by the bayous, marshes, and lagoons of Southern Louisiana. Viavant painted the birds, fish, and small game that he knew from hunting the family land outside of New Orleans.
