= Port of Cabo Rojo =

- Click on the map for a fullscreen view

Location
- Coordinates: 17°55′31″N 71°39′30″W

Port of Cabo Rojo or Cabo Rojo Port is a port located in Cabo Rojo, Dominican Republic province of Pedernales. It has two installations for Grapnel export.

This terminal is operated by Colombian company Cementos Andino (Andino Concrete), which handles export of clinker, limestone, bauxite, and concrete.

== History ==
The Port was built by the Aluminum Corporation of America (Alcoa) for export of bauxite and limestone.

== Information ==
- Local time: UTC−4
- Climate: mostly sunny, tropical. Hurricane season runs from June to November
- Prevailing winds: direction ENE–ESE
- Average temperature range: 28–30 °C

== See also ==
- List of ports and harbours of the Atlantic Ocean
