= Chelem =

Beach in Yucatán, Mexico

Coordinates: 21°16′N 89°45′W

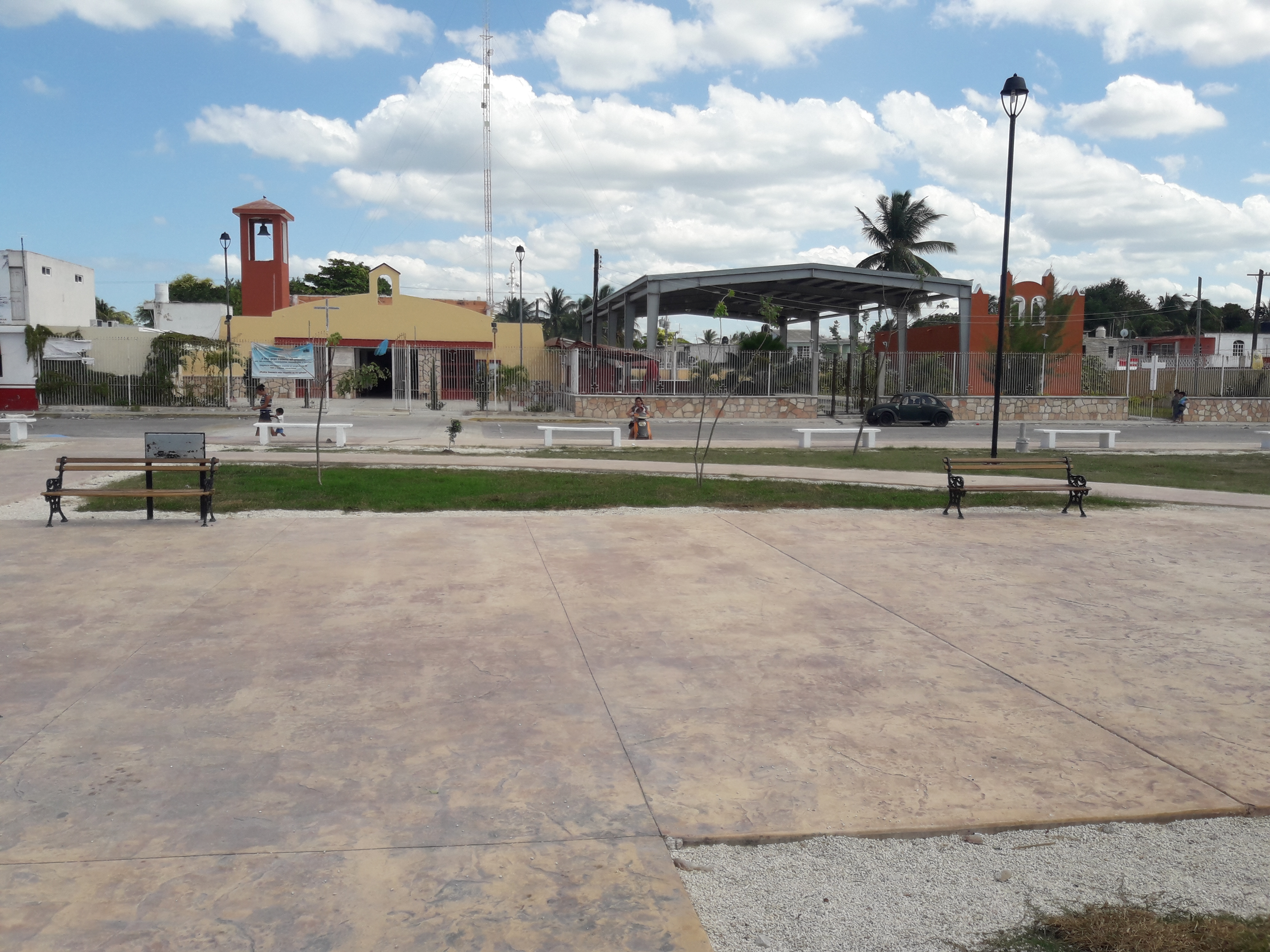
Main plaza of Chelem in 2018

Chelem is a beach town in Progreso Municipality, Yucatán, Mexico.

== Geography ==
Chelem is around 43 km (27 mi) from Mérida, the state capital. In 2024, the town had about 3,000 residents.

== History ==
In March 2014, the Secretariat of Urban Development and Environment (Seduma) brought sand from Playón Poniente to placed it in Chelem in an effort to recover the beach. They also constructed breakwaters to protect the coastal area.

In July 2020, Francisco "Leoncio" Abreu Rosado, a temporary resident of Chelem, issued a formal complaint against Office of the Federal Attorney for Environmental Protection (PROFEPA) and the town authorities that a landowner in Chelem was constructing breakwaters at the beach without legal authorization. The incident was resolved by August, when authorities reported that the breakwaters had been reduced to their original size.

In July 2024, Mexican authorities reported several confrontations between local residents and foreigners in Chelem over construction and property development along the beach, which authorities described as an environmental risk.
