= Multimodal Caucedo Port =

The Multimodal Caucedo Port is located in Caucedo, Boca Chica, Santo Domingo Province, Dominican Republic. This harbor is only used for cargo operations incoming from several countries in the Caribbean zone and is the youngest and the most modern port in the island.

Caucedo is managed by DP World, a global port operator that was founded in 2005 by a merger of Dubai Ports Authority and Dubai Ports International. DP World Caucedo is a maritime terminal and global free zone located 25km away from Santo Domingo.

In July 2017, DP World Caucedo confirmed they successfully received the largest ship that has ever visited the Dominican Republic. The Malta-flagged container ship, COSCO YANTIAN, has an overall length of 350.55m and is able to transport 9,469 containers, weighing 107,498 tons.

== Overview ==
Caucedo Port has one container terminal, which is located next to Las Americas International Airport. The terminal was built in 2003 by the private sector.

According to a statistical report submitted by Dominican Port Authority (APORDOM) for January to June 2017, Multimodal Caucedo port had 66.3% of TEU (Twenty-foot Equivalent Unit) movement in the island, followed by Rio Haina Port with 27.4%, and the other ports in the Dominican Republic handling 6.1%.

Caucedo Logistics Center is the first and only free trade zone located within a port facility in the Dominican Republic.

In December 2018 Caucedo held a groundbreaking ceremony for the construction of an additional 400 meters of berth with a 17 meter draft increasing its capacity by 45%.

== See also ==
- List of ports and harbours of the Atlantic Ocean

== Port information ==
- CAU - CAUCEDO
- Location: 18°25′28″N 69°37′45″W
- Local time: UTC−4
- Berthing Capacity: 600 meters
- Weather/climate/prevailing winds: From May 15 until September 15
- Climate: mostly sunny, tropical. Hurricane season runs from June to November
- Prevailing winds: direction ENE–ESE
- Average temperature range: 28C–30 °C
