= Progreso, Yucatán =

City in the Mexican state of Yucatán

Progreso
- City
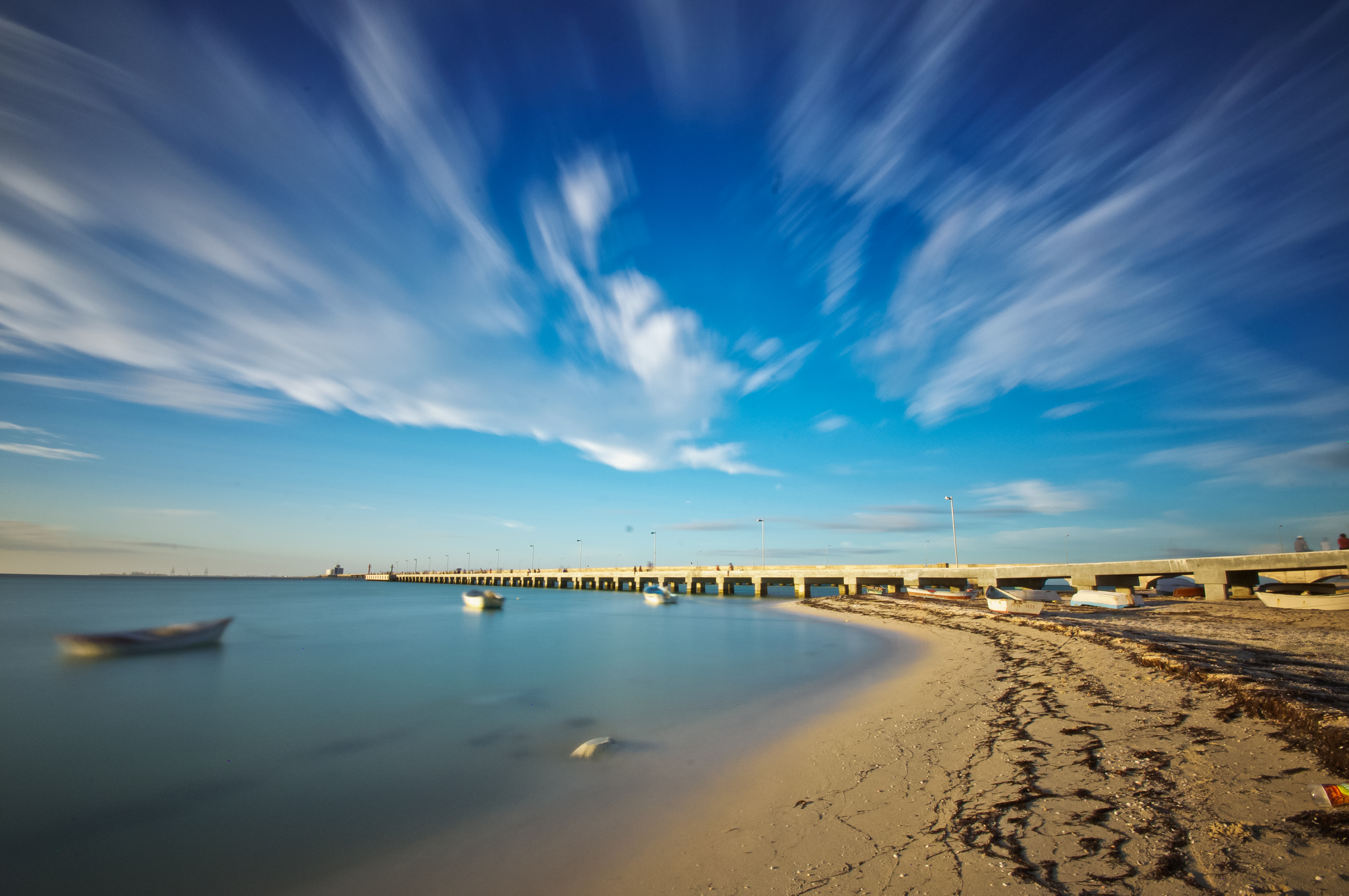
- Progreso Beach

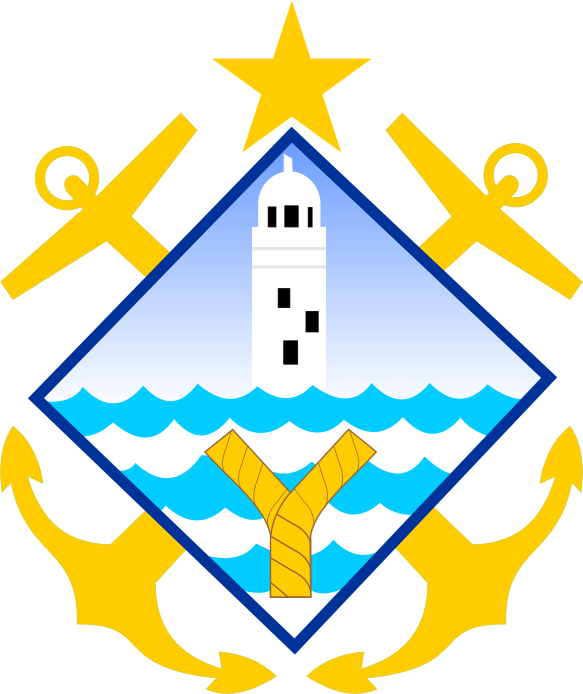
- Coat of arms

- Location of Progreso in Yucatán

- Location within Yucatán (state) Location within Mexico
- Coordinates: 21°16′48″N 89°40′12″W
- Country: Mexico
- State: Yucatán
- Municipality: Progreso

Government
  - Municipal President: Erik Rihani (2022-2028)

Area
  - Total: 270.10 km^{2} (104.29 sq mi)
- Elevation: 0 m (0 ft)

Population
  - Total: 53,958
  - Density: 199.77/km^{2} (517.40/sq mi)
- Time zone: UTC-6 (CST)
- Codigo Postal: 97320
- Area code: 969
- Major Airport: Merida (Manuel Crescencio Rejón) International Airport
- IATA Code: MID
- ICAO Code: MMMD

Progreso (Spanish pronunciation: [pɾoˈɣɾeso]) is a port city in the Mexican state of Yucatán, located on the Gulf of Mexico in the north-west of the state some 30 minutes north of state capital Mérida (the biggest city on the Yucatán Peninsula) by highway. As of the Mexican census of 2010, Progreso had an official population of 37,369 inhabitants, the sixth largest community in the state in population. The city is also the municipal seat of the surrounding municipality of the same name. The municipality's area is 270.10 km^{2} (104.29 sq mi) and its population at the census was 49,454 inhabitants. It includes Scorpion Reef with its five islets 130 km offshore (north) on the outer edge of Campeche Bank. Its largest other towns are Chicxulub Puerto, Campestre Flamboyanes, and Chelem.

== Port ==
The Port of Progreso is a center for both the fishing industry and the container industry. All containers arrive in Progreso and are distributed to Yucatán, Campeche and Quintana Roo.

Progreso is also a port for large cruise ships and an emerging balneario resort destination. Passengers disembark on the Terminal Remota, a pier that juts out 6.5 km (4.0 mi) into the Gulf of Mexico.

== Tourism ==
During the months of July and August the beaches fill with thousands of mostly local tourists, as it is traditional in these months for residents of Mérida to leave the city and spend the summer in the cooler seaside environment.

== History ==
Progreso was founded in 1872 by Don Juan Miguel Castro, to create a sea port closer to Mérida than the older port of Sisal, Yucatán.

== Geography ==
To the North of Progreso is a small town called Komchen, home to the Yucatan Polo Club.

=== Climate ===
Despite its coastal location and fairly humid climate (average humidity around 70–80%), Progreso has a semi-arid climate (Köppen climate classification BSh). There is little variation in average temperatures though the winter months from December to March are noticeably cooler. Precipitation is scarce throughout the year but is more abundant from June to October. On average, there are 36 days with measureable rainfall.

Climate data for Progreso, Yucatan (1951–1980)
Month	Jan	Feb	Mar	Apr	May	Jun	Jul	Aug	Sep	Oct	Nov	Dec	Year
Record high °C (°F)	33.5 (92.3)	34.4 (93.9)	38.6 (101.5)	38.0 (100.4)	44.2 (111.6)	35.0 (95.0)	34.6 (94.3)	33.5 (92.3)	33.6 (92.5)	33.0 (91.4)	33.6 (92.5)	33.0 (91.4)	44.2 (111.6)
Mean daily maximum °C (°F)	25.5 (77.9)	26.2 (79.2)	28.6 (83.5)	29.9 (85.8)	30.2 (86.4)	30.0 (86.0)	29.5 (85.1)	29.6 (85.3)	29.6 (85.3)	28.4 (83.1)	27.1 (80.8)	25.8 (78.4)	28.4 (83.1)
Daily mean °C (°F)	22.9 (73.2)	23.1 (73.6)	24.9 (76.8)	26.2 (79.2)	27.1 (80.8)	27.3 (81.1)	27.2 (81.0)	27.3 (81.1)	27.2 (81.0)	26.5 (79.7)	24.9 (76.8)	23.5 (74.3)	25.7 (78.3)
Mean daily minimum °C (°F)	20.1 (68.2)	20.0 (68.0)	21.6 (70.9)	22.9 (73.2)	24.1 (75.4)	24.7 (76.5)	24.6 (76.3)	24.8 (76.6)	24.8 (76.6)	24.2 (75.6)	22.5 (72.5)	20.9 (69.6)	22.9 (73.2)
Record low °C (°F)	10.0 (50.0)	9.2 (48.6)	13.8 (56.8)	14.8 (58.6)	17.6 (63.7)	19.2 (66.6)	18.8 (65.8)	19.6 (67.3)	19.8 (67.6)	17.6 (63.7)	15.0 (59.0)	14.0 (57.2)	9.2 (48.6)
Average rainfall mm (inches)	15.4 (0.61)	19.5 (0.77)	3.5 (0.14)	6.9 (0.27)	25.3 (1.00)	64.6 (2.54)	44.5 (1.75)	48.5 (1.91)	93.6 (3.69)	64.2 (2.53)	20.1 (0.79)	17.1 (0.67)	423.2 (16.66)
Average rainy days (≥ 0.1 mm)	1.60	1.70	0.66	0.80	1.96	4.60	4.30	4.26	6.96	4.30	2.46	2.51	36.11
Average relative humidity (%)	75	73	72	72	75	79	81	81	82	76	75	76	76
Mean monthly sunshine hours	199.6	193.0	203.4	188.7	221.1	218.7	234.8	233.3	200.4	207.8	194.0	198.0	2,492.8
Source: Colegio de Postgraduados (humidity and sun)

== Photo gallery ==
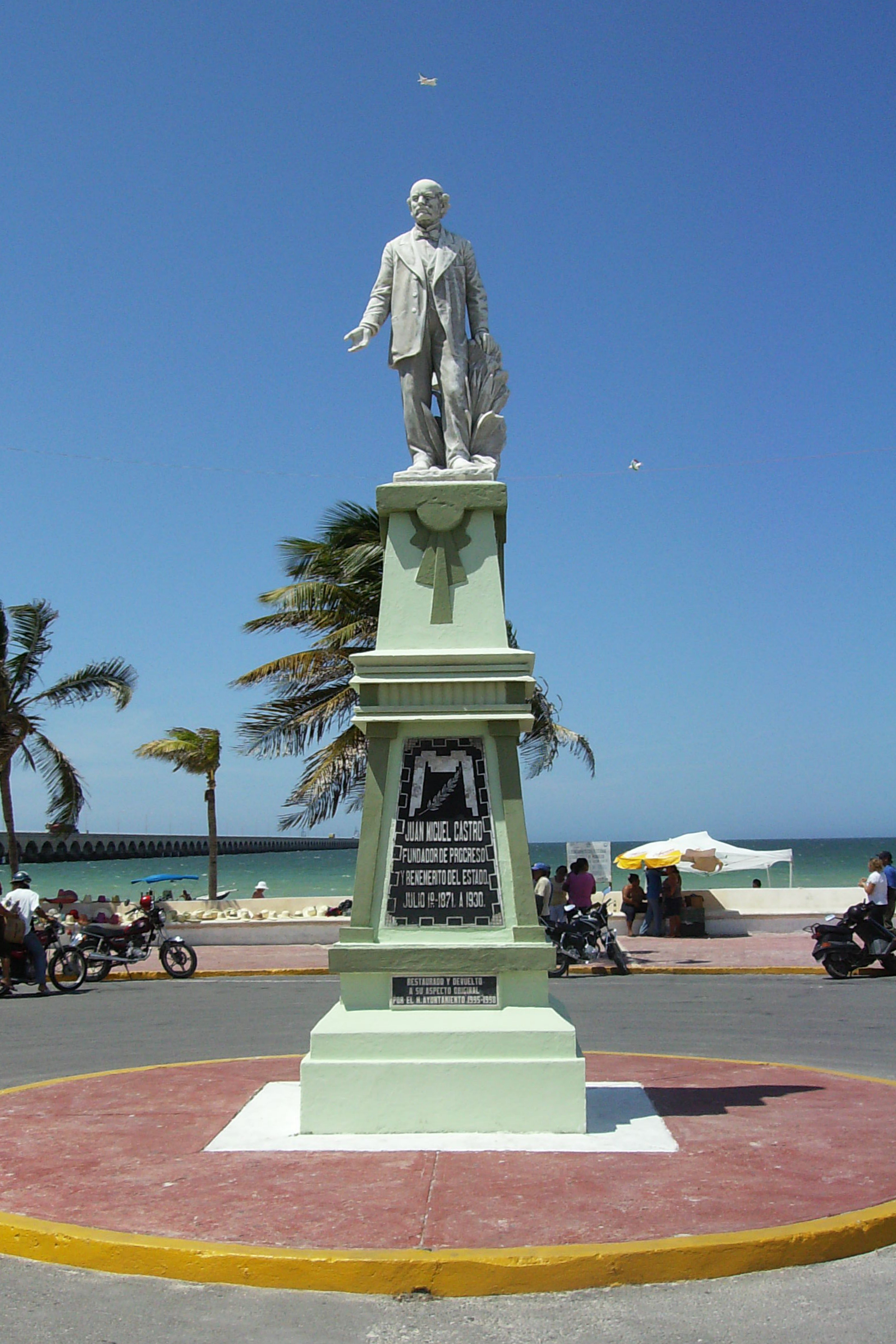
Progreso, Yucatán founder's statue

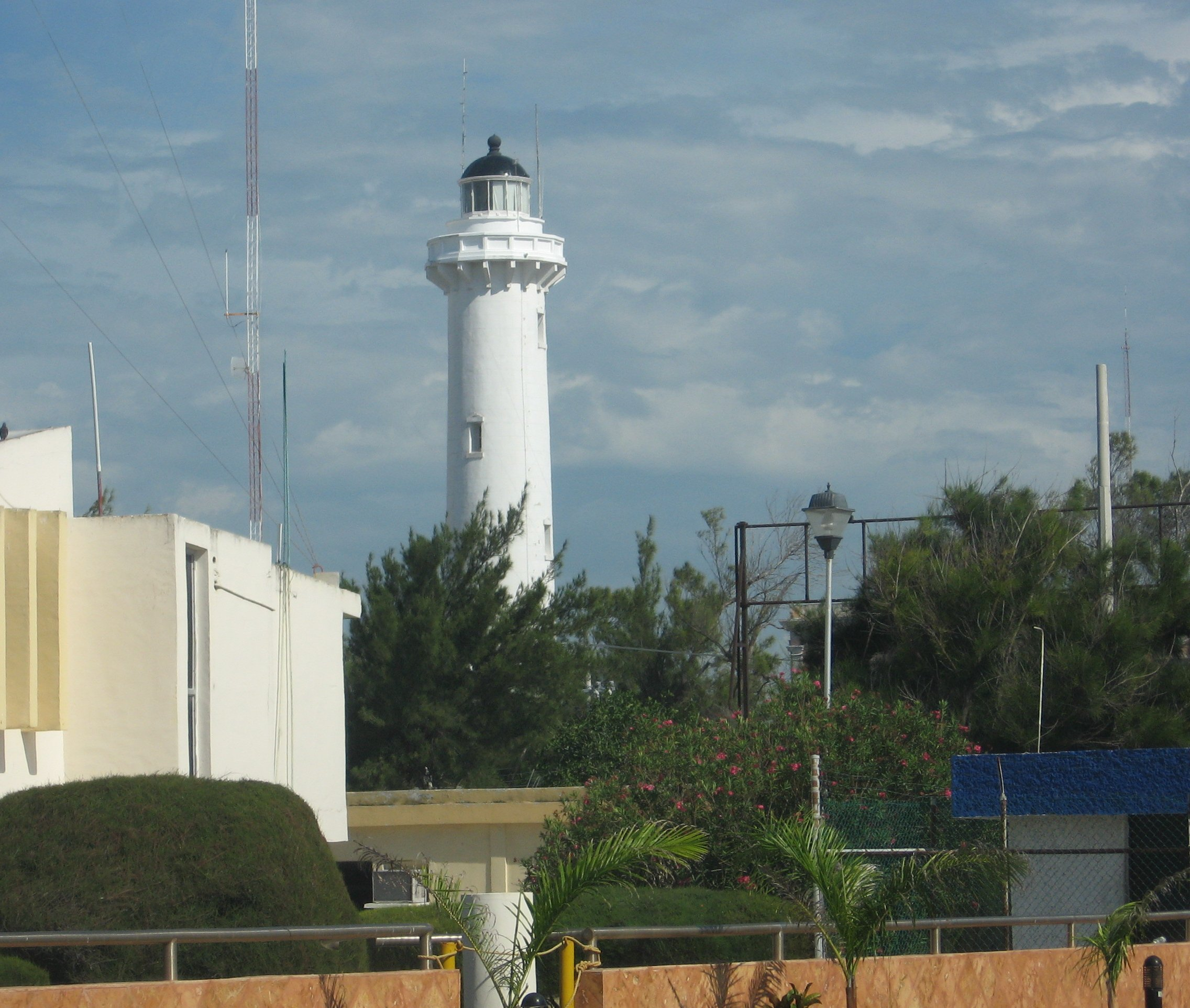
Lighthouse at Progreso

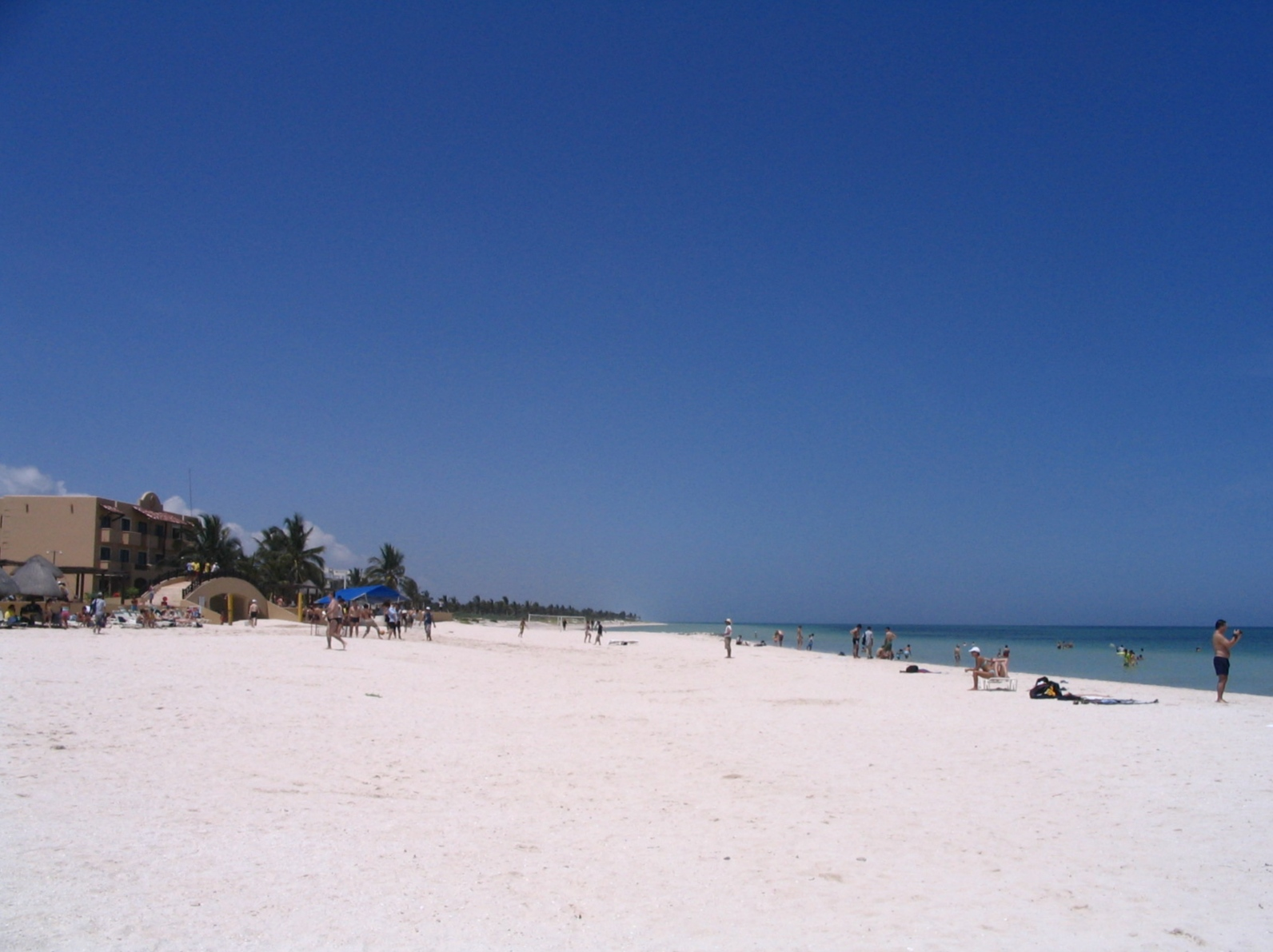
Beach at Progreso

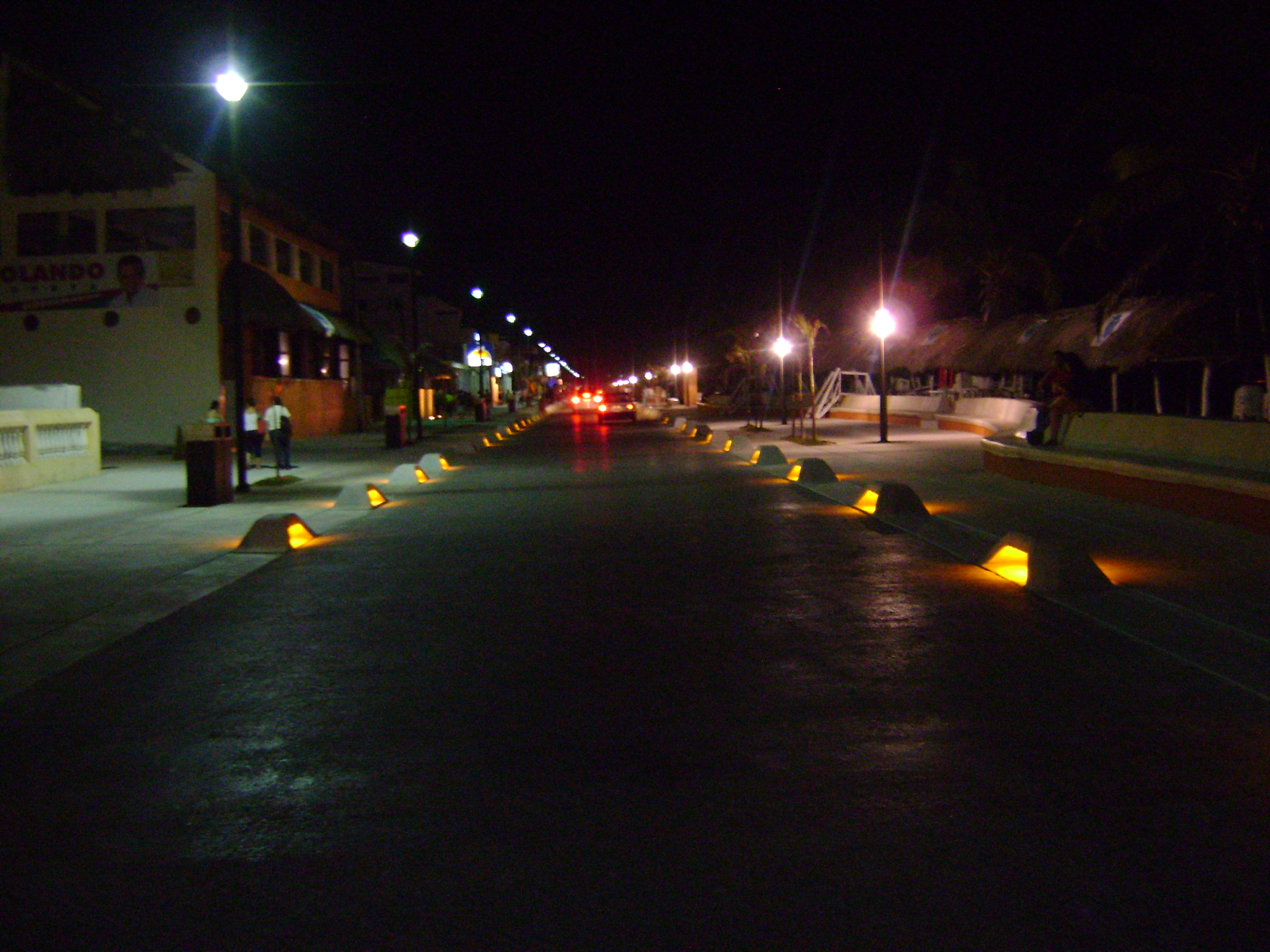
Progreso's International Boulevard (locally named as Malecón) at night.
