= Northern Indiana Maritime District =

The Northern Indiana Maritime District is a proposed maritime district covering the northern portion of the Ports of Indiana. It was proposed by the Ports of Indiana and the U.S. Army Corps of Engineers.

Alicia Thomas at Ports of Indiana said creation of the maritime district would help "develop a more accurate inventory of ports to be used for national multiple freight and infrastructure planning and recognition of annual tonnage."

== Scope ==
The district would include all Indiana counties bordering Lake Michigan, which include Lake, Porter and LaPorte counties. This includes the entire Indiana shoreline on Lake Michigan (approx. 40 miles), starting where the state border intersects the Lake Michigan shoreline from the west in Hammond to the east in Michiana Shores.

== Economy ==
Indiana's shoreline on Lake Michigan accounts for over 50% of U.S. shipping activity on the Great Lakes, over 25% of the nation's steel production and 30 million tons in annual shipments by ocean vessels, lakers and barges.

As of 2019, The Northern Indiana Maritime District provided 18,430 direct jobs, 20,563 induced jobs, 27,424 indirect jobs, and 32,048 related jobs.

In 2020, the Northern Indiana Maritime District shipped over 23 million Dry Bulk short tons.
