= Progreso Municipality, Yucatán =

Municipality in the Mexican state of Yucatán

Progreso
- Municipality
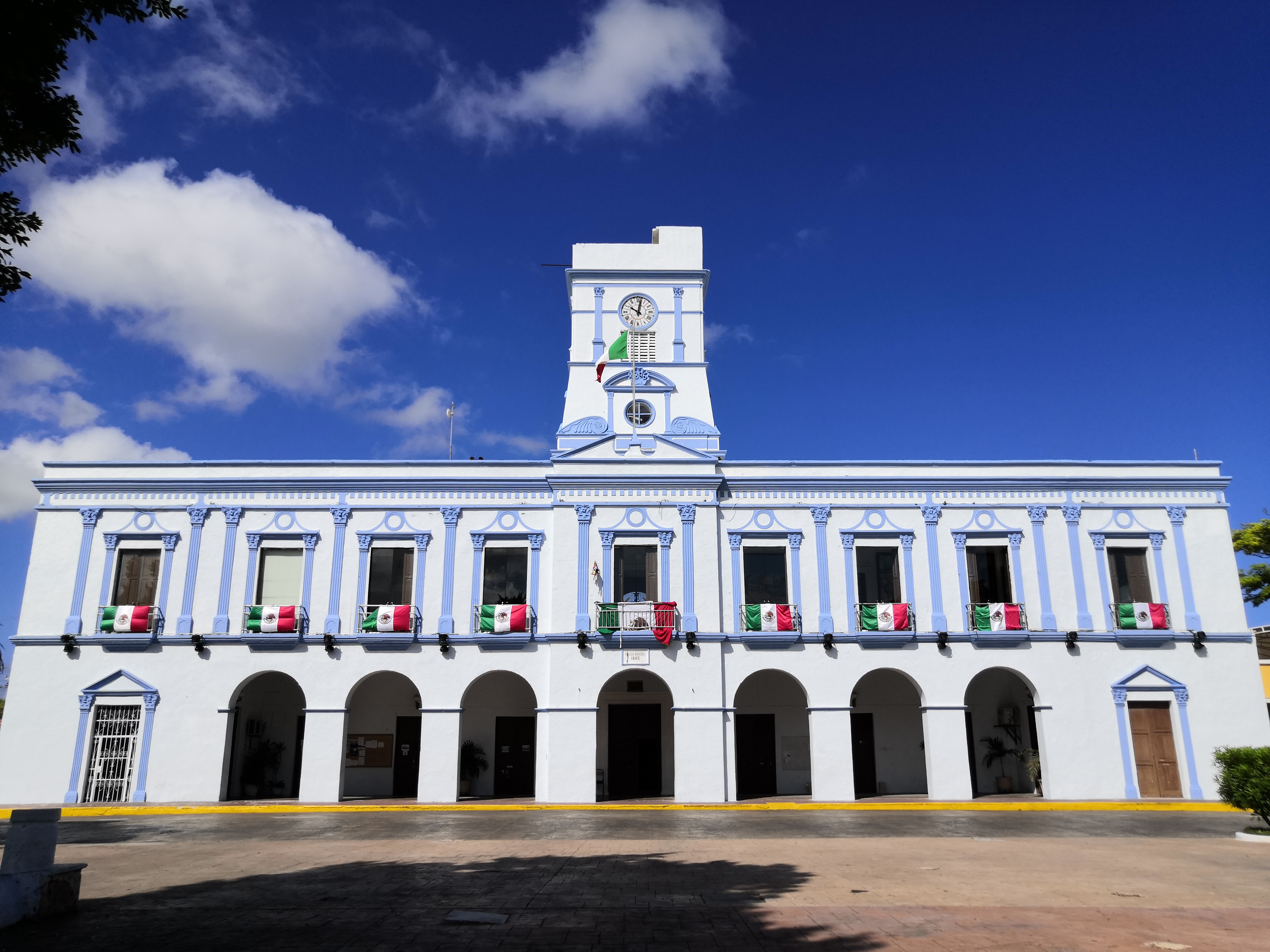
- Municipal Palace of Progreso, Yucatán

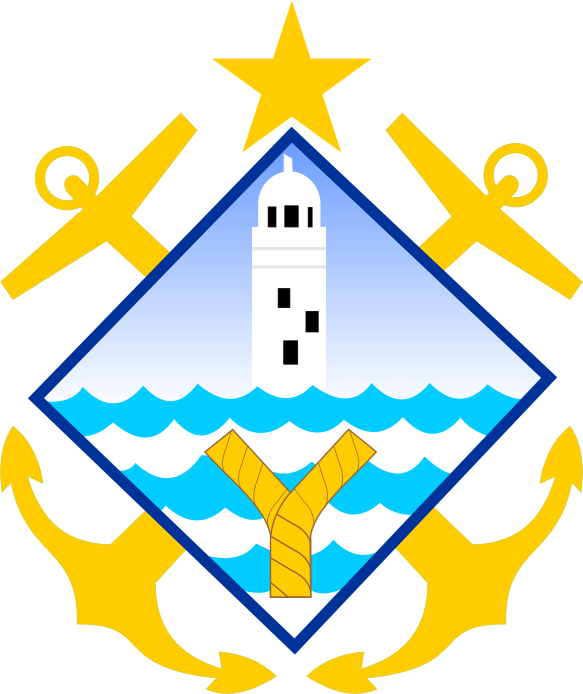
- Coat of arms

- Region 2 Noroeste #059

- Location of the Municipality in Mexico
- Coordinates: 21°16′58″N 89°39′49″W
- Country: Mexico
- State: Yucatán

Government
  - Type: 2021–2023
  - Municipal President: Julián Zacarías Curi

Area
  - Total: 270.10 km^{2} (104.29 sq mi)
- Elevation: 2 m (6.6 ft)

Population (2010)
  - Total: 53,958
- Time zone: UTC-6 (Central Standard Time)
- INEGI Code: 009
- Major Airport: Merida (Manuel Crescencio Rejón) International Airport
- IATA Code: MID
- ICAO Code: MMMD

Progreso Municipality (In the Spanish language: “progress”) is a municipality in the Mexican state of Yucatán containing 270.10 km^{2} of land and located roughly 25 km north of the city of Mérida.

== History ==
Progreso is one of the youngest towns in the Yucatán. Juan Miguel Castro Martín, owner of several sisal haciendas, including an estate called Hacienda San Pedro Chimay was the founder of the Port of Progreso. He began urging development of a new port in 1840 to further the henequen trade. The town was authorized under President Ignacio Comonfort on 25 February 1856 and was officially founded on 1 July 1871 as the Port of Progreso.

On 8 January 1875, the first City Council was formed and the town was elevated to a villa, soon after decreed a city by the state government, and construction of the city hall commenced. In 1881, freight and passenger rail service began and in 1893, the lighthouse opened.

In 1936, the Danish company "Christiane & Nielsen" began construction of malecón (sea wall), which was completed in 1947. It was upgraded in 1968 In 2011, work began to rebuild the malecón and upgrade the entrance of the port.

== Governance ==
The municipal president is elected for a term of three years. The president appoints nine Councilpersons to serve on the board for three year terms, as the Secretary and councilors who oversee police and police stations; health and public works; transportation and education; special events; disability regulations; recruitment; and parks and public gardens.

The Municipal Council administers the business of the municipality. It is responsible for budgeting and expenditures and producing all required reports for all branches of the municipal administration. Annually it determines educational standards for schools.

The Police Commissioners ensure public order and safety. They are tasked with enforcing regulations, distributing materials and administering rulings of general compliance issued by the council.

== Communities ==
The head of the municipality is Progreso, Yucatán. The populated communities include Campestre Flamboyanes, Chelem, Chen Huayún, Chicxulub Puerto, Chuburná, El Divino Redentor, El Paraíso, Estopas Peninsulares, Ha Uay, Jesús Nazareno, La Gracia de Dios, La Perseverancia, Montesino, Progreso, Rancho San Pedro, San Antonio, San Ignacio, San Juan, and Yucmich. The major population areas are shown below:

Community	Population
Entire Municipality (2010)	53,958
Campestre Flamboyanes	3022 in 2005
Chelem	3017 in 2005
Chicxulub Puerto	5052 in 2005
Chuburná	1720 in 2005
Progreso	35519 in 2005
San Ignacio	767 in 2005

== Local festivals ==
Every year a carnival is celebrated from 15 to 30 April and 1 June is a fiesta for the Navy. On 7 August, the feast of San Telmo, patron of fishermen, is recognized.

== Tourist attractions ==
- 19th Century Maritime Customs Building
- Municipal Palace
- Progreso lighthouse
- Customs Pier considered the longest in the country
- Chapel of San Antonio Yaxactún
- Hacienda Cuyo de Ancona
- Hacienda San Ignacio
