= Port of Progreso =

Progreso
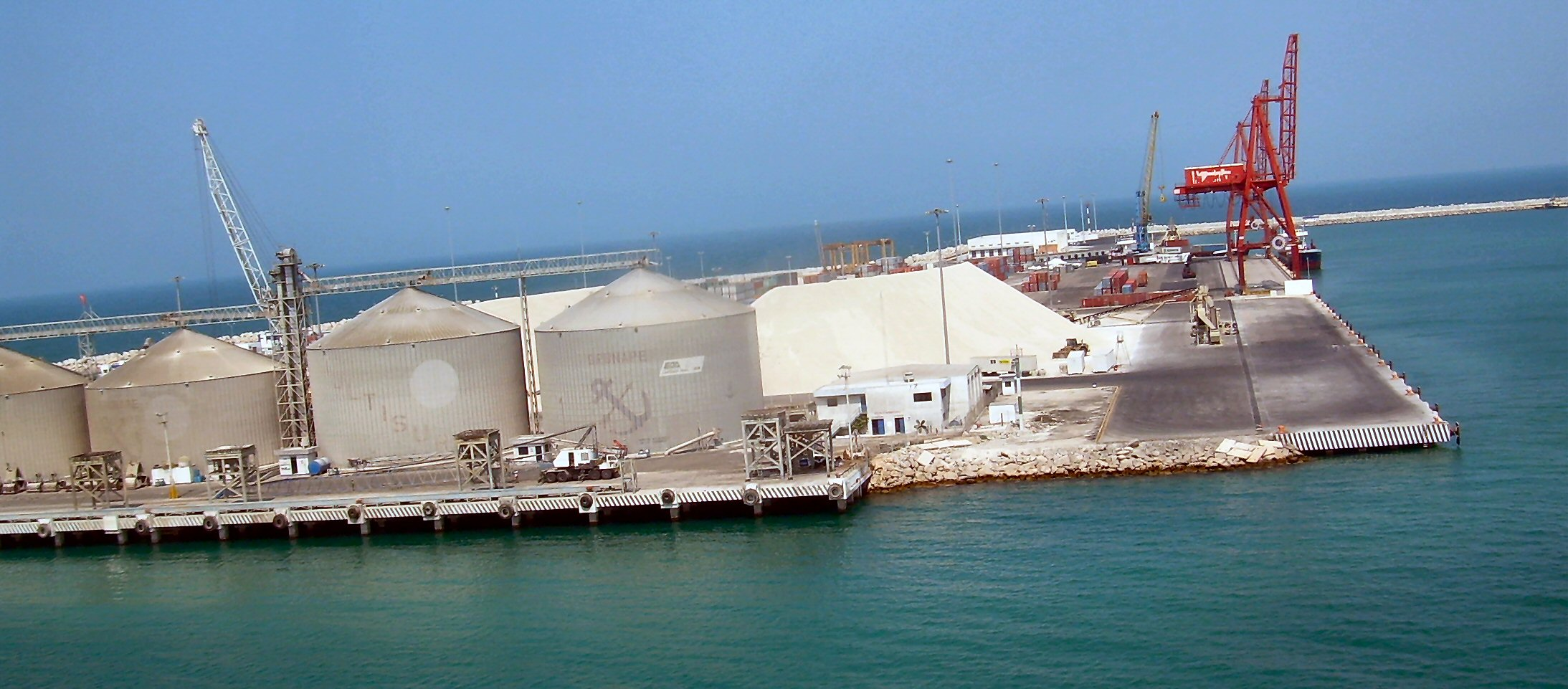
- Port of Progreso in 2009
- Click on the map for a fullscreen view
- Progreso (Mexico)

Location
- Country: Mexico
- Location: Progreso, Yucatán
- Coordinates: 21°20.8′N 89°40.7′W
- UN/LOCODE: MXPGO

Details
- Opened: 1856; 1941 pier harbour
- No. of berths: 10
- Draft depth: 12.19 metres (40.0 ft)

Statistics
- Website www.puertosyucatan.com

The Port of Progreso is a port facility located north of Progreso, Yucatán, on Mexico's Gulf coast. It lies on the Yucatán Peninsula, 43 kilometres (27 mi) north by west of the state capital at Mérida.

A multipurpose port, Progreso handles cruise ships, breakbulk, dry bulk and containers, and has a single jetty handling tanker traffic.

The port is at the end of the world's longest pier, 8,019 metres (26,309 ft) in length, as verified by the Guinness Book of World Records.

== History ==
The town of Progreso was founded in 1856 to become the harbour of Mérida. It was mainly used for exporting Sisal fibres from the huge plantations around like Misnebalam, Xtul, Santa Elena etc. and for fishing. Due to the local situation, the seabed slopes extremely gently at a gradient of 1:1000, while a permanent coastal current of 0.15 to 0.3 m/s immediately floods every shipping channel in the approximately 4-meter-high sand layer, the port was difficult to access for larger vessels.

Therefore, from 1937 to 1941, the 2 kilometres (1.2 mi) long pier of Progreso was built with 146 arches to accommodate larger ships. The work was carried out by the Danish company Christiani & Nielsen, who convinced with a concept using concrete piers and arches and stainless steel reinforcement for the pier in order to minimize maintenance work due to future corrosion damage.

To accommodate the growth of ships with deeper drafts, a new 64-hectare long-distance terminal was built between 1985 and 1989, along with a breakwater as a causeway, extending the existing pier by 4.5 km to a total of 6.5 kilometres (4.0 mi). The breakwater was constructed from rockfill because the sandy seabed requires a water-accessible structure to prevent unwanted deposits and erosion. Further out, the seabed is rocky.

In 1999/2000, the long-distance terminal was further expanded, and a second bridge structure was built parallel to the pier dating from the 1930s. The deep-sea shipping channel, which is 150 metres (490 ft) wide and 7.8 kilometres (4.8 mi) long, was dredged to a depth of 12 metres (40 ft). The terminal's harbor basin accommodates ships with a draft of 9.75 metres (32 ft). Since then, the long-distance terminal has two berths for container ships, three for general cargo, one for bulk cargo (grain), one for petroleum products, and three for cruise ships and ferries.

In 2005, the port handled over 4 million tons of goods, which increased to 7.3 million tons in 2019 and 10.1 million tons in 2023.

== Port Expansion ==
In December 2024, the Mexican government announced an investment of USD1.6 billion in six key strategic ports, including Progreso. Progreso's share will be USD367 million and will fund the creation of an 80 hectare platform to accommodate a shipyard and terminals for liquefied gas and petroleum. It will also include extending the Maya Train to Progreso, allowing freight trains to deliver cargo to the port.

The shipyard will be built and operated by Italian shipbuilder Fincantieri, who will invest more than USD150 million in building 2 graving docks at the port.
