= Port of South Louisiana =

Coordinates: 30.051°N 90.500°W

- Interactive map of Port of South Louisiana

Statistics
- Website www.portsl.com

The Port of South Louisiana handles the largest amount of shipping, in tonnage, of all U.S. ports.

The Port of South Louisiana (French: Port de la Louisiane du Sud) extends 54 miles (87 km) along the Mississippi River between New Orleans, Louisiana and Baton Rouge, Louisiana, centering approximately at LaPlace, Louisiana, which serves as the Port's headquarters location.

This port is critical for grain shipments from the Midwest, handling some 60% of all raw grain exports.

== Geography ==
The ports of New Orleans, South Louisiana, and Baton Rouge cover 172 miles (277 km) on both banks of the Mississippi River. The Mississippi River-Gulf Outlet Canal (now closed by a rock dike built across the channel at Bayou La Loutre) extends 67 miles (108 km) from New Orleans to the Gulf of Mexico, and the channel up the Mississippi River from New Orleans to Baton Rouge runs at a 48-foot (15-meter) draft. Overall, the navigational depths range from 12 to 48 feet (3.7 to 14.6 m) along the river, channels, and side canals. After Hurricane Katrina, the National Oceanic and Atmospheric Administration Office of Coast Survey used boats with sonar and scanners to assess underwater damage to the ports. Port authorities used these surveys to make decisions about when to open or close the ports.

== Exports and imports ==
These three ports are significant to the economy of the United States. The ports of South Louisiana, New Orleans, and Baton Rouge rank third, fourth, and fifteenth, respectively in total trade by port to all world ports. In terms of dollar value, total trade by port to all world ports, New Orleans, South Louisiana, and Baton Rouge, rank 12th, 16th, and 27th, respectively. About 6,000 vessels pass through the Port of New Orleans annually.

According to the North American Export Grain Association, as of August 2005, these three ports serve as a gateway for nearly 55 to 70 percent of all U.S. exported corn, soy, and wheat. Barges carry these grains from the Mississippi River to the ports for storage and export. Imports to these ports include steel, rubber, coffee, fruits, and vegetables.

== See also ==
- Port of New Orleans
- Port of Greater Baton Rouge
- Louisiana Offshore Oil Port
- List of ports in the United States
