= Port of Puerto Plata =

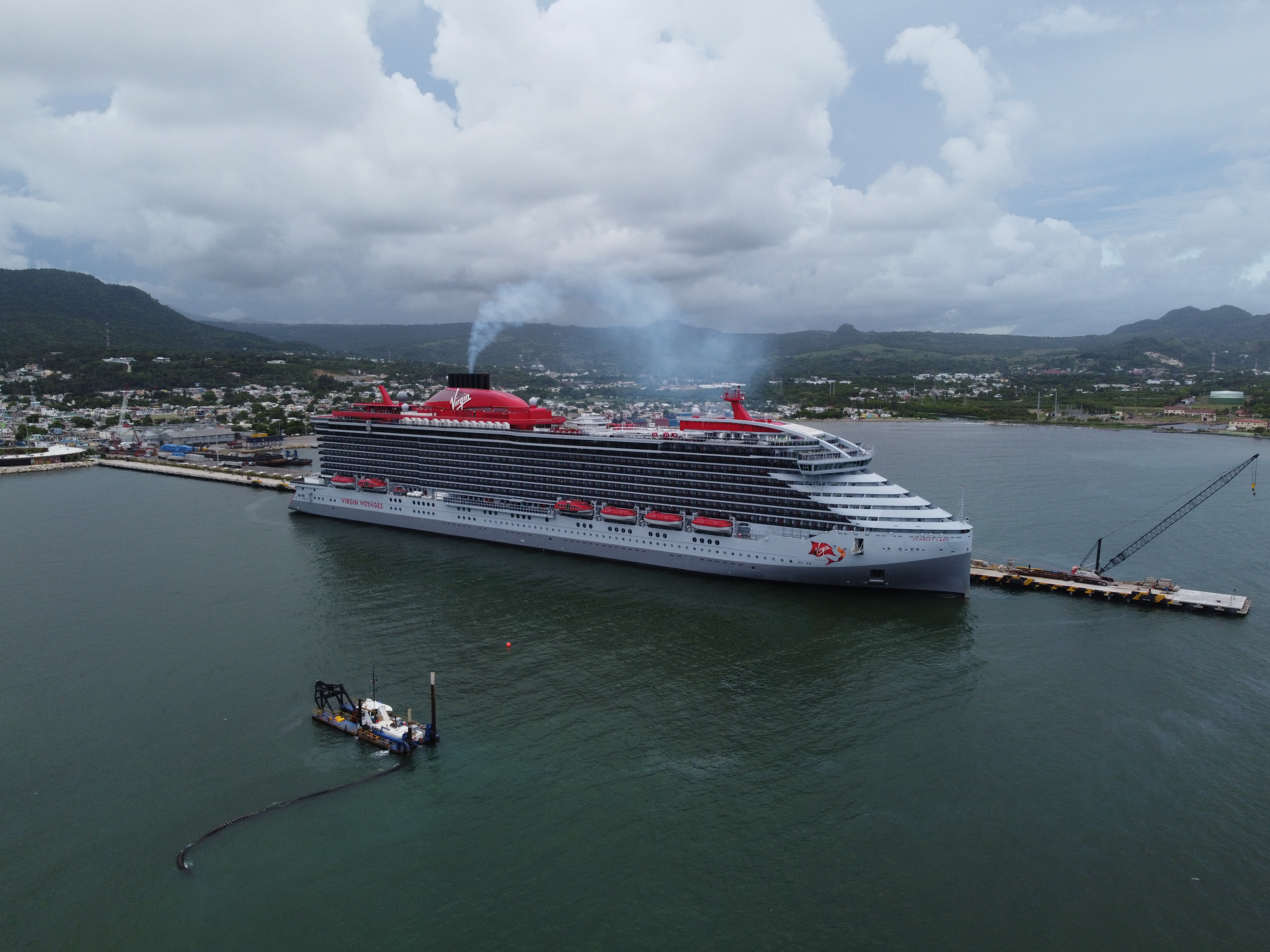
Taíno Bay Tourist Port

The Port of Puerto Plata is found in San Felipe de Puerto Plata, in Dominican Republic. This is the main port on the north coast and is currently used for cargo operations. In December 2021, the new Taino Bay tourist and cargo terminal was inaugurated.

El Taíno Bay Tourist Port is a cruise terminal. Its recently built berths allow the simultaneous docking of three ships and the disembarkation of up to 14,000 passengers. This terminal consolidates Puerto Plata as one of the main destinations in the Caribbean. Taino Bay offers new tourist facilities that include commercial spaces, restaurants and bars.

The Taino Bay Port in the Puerto Plata cruise port opened operations today with the arrival of the MSC Seashore, a modern EVO class cruise ship with 4,540 passengers and capacity for more than 1,700 crew members. The ship was built for MSC Cruises in Italy and arrived on December 15, 2021 at 8:00 AM. m. to host the opening ceremony with the Dominican Republic.

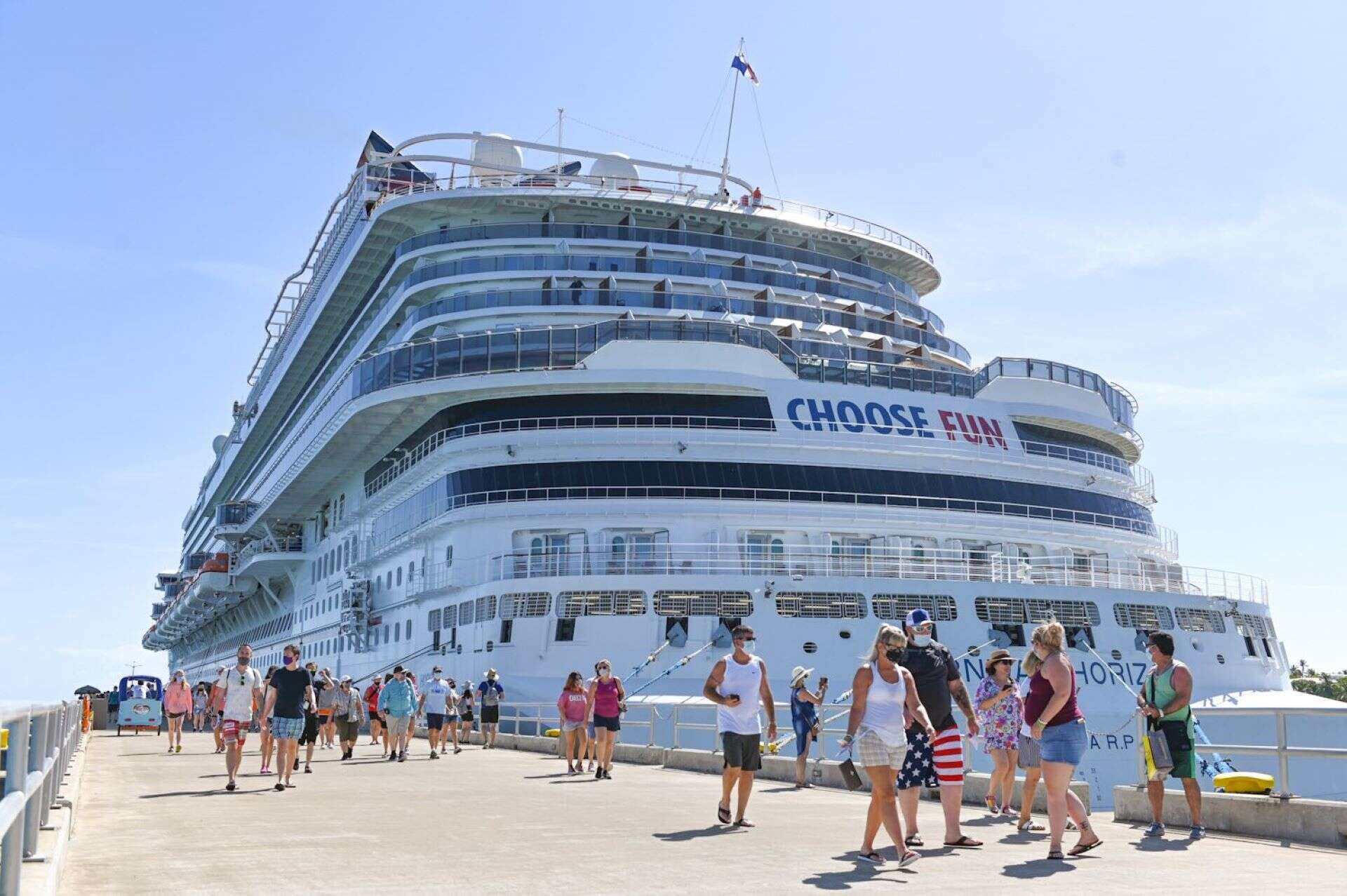
Taíno Bay Tourist Port

Taino Bay will replace the old cargo port of Puerto Plata, placing cruise passengers just steps from the historic district that includes Fort San Felipe, an important historical site, and the colonial heart of Puerto Plata where a 16-block area will be located. undergoing major renovations and improvements by the government.

That area includes dozens of gift shops, antique shops and iconic places like Paseo Doña Blanca, the Parque Central, the Cathedral of San Felipe, the Gregorio Luperón museum, the Ámbar Gallery, Paraguas Street, the Amber Museum, the Historical Fire Department and many more places. where the cruise passengers' tour will take place.

== Overview ==
The Port of Puerto Plata is the third most important port in the country. It has two terminals; one of them is currently being repaired by the government for tourism cruise operations, and it is known as Muelle Viejo. The other is currently operating and it is called Muelle Nuevo.

This harbor operates container cargo, general cargo, fuel and tourist cruise management.

Concerns regarding unethical wildlife tourism and animal abuse have been raised regarding the Taino Bay cruise port.

== See also ==
- List of ports and harbours of the Atlantic Ocean

== Port information ==
- Location: 19°48′10″N 70°42′0″W
- Local time: UTC−4
- Weather/climate/prevailing winds: From May 15 until September 15.
- Climate: mostly sunny, tropical. Hurricane season runs from June to November.
- Prevailing winds: direction ENE–ESE.
- Average temperature range: 28–30 °C.
