= Haina River =

- Location of the mouth
- Native name: Rio Haina (Spanish)

Location
- Country: Dominican Republic
- Municipality: Santo Domingo

Physical characteristics
- Mouth: Santo Domingo Basin, Caribbean Sea
  - coordinates: 18°24′55″N 70°01′05″W
- Length: 86 km (53 mi)

The Haina River is a waterway situated in the Dominican Republic. It flows along the eastern boundary of the hydrographic district encompassing Azua, Baní, and San Cristóbal.

In 1496, according to Floyd, "Miguel Diaz and Francisco de Garay, working their way down the Haina river, discovered rich deposits of gold in the river sands perhaps twenty-five miles from the coast." Bartolome Colon built a fort along this river, "well situated within the gold region", which he named San Cristobal.

== Overview ==
Haina River stretches across a length of 86 km. It originates from Loma El Zumbador of Lomas de Maimón in the Central Mountain range, located Northwest of Villa Altagracia. The river flows into the Caribbean Sea, east of the municipality Bajos de Haina, approximately 14 km west of the Ozama River.

== Etymology ==
Julian Granberry and Gary Vescelius suggest a Macoris etymology for the name haina, comparing it with ha-ina 'many nets' in the purportedly related Warao language of the Orinoco Delta.

== See also ==
- List of rivers of the Dominican Republic
