= Port of Greater Baton Rouge =

- Interactive map of Port of Greater Baton Rouge

Location
- Country: United States
- Location: Port Allen, Louisiana
- Coordinates: 30.431793°N 91.203904°W

Details
- Opened: 1956
- Operated by: Greater Baton Rouge Port Commission
- Owned by: State of Louisiana
- Employees: 300

Statistics
- Annual cargo tonnage: 4.11 million
- Annual revenue: US$6,699,731
- Website www.portgbr.com

The Port of Greater Baton Rouge is the tenth largest port in the United States in terms of tonnage shipped, and is the northernmost port on the Mississippi River capable of handling Panamax ships.

== History ==
=== Early period ===
Before the 20th century, Baton Rouge's waterfront consisted primarily of wooden wharves along the Mississippi River. Commerce was supported by these simple facilities, supplemented by private docks operated by industrial firms along the river. In 1909, the establishment of a major refinery (then operated by a predecessor of ExxonMobil) added significant private dock traffic to the area.

By the early 1920s, it became clear that a public docking facility was needed to serve smaller shippers and general cargo beyond refinery traffic.

=== Municipal Dock (1926) ===
In 1926, the publicly owned Baton Rouge Municipal Dock was opened on the east bank of the Mississippi River. This facility provided a modern concrete pier, warehouse space, and intermodal transfer capability between ships, barges, and rail — enabling oceangoing vessels to load and unload cargo for inland distribution.

=== Creation of the Port Authority and Modern Expansion ===
On November 4, 1952, the state legislature created the Greater Baton Rouge Port Commission, giving it authority to regulate river commerce and build public port facilities. In 1954 construction began on the first major port facilities under this authority, including General Cargo Dock No. 1 and a grain elevator/grain dock on the west bank of the river. Since then, the port has expanded significantly to include deep-water docks, bulk and liquid-bulk terminals (e.g. for petroleum, molasses, chemicals), grain elevators, barge terminals, intermodal infrastructure (rail, truck, barge), and a terminal on the gulf-intracoastal waterway.

== Facilities ==
The Port of Greater Baton Rouge includes:

- A deep-water complex on the Mississippi River capable of handling ocean-going (Panamax-size) vessels. The shipping channel is maintained at approximately 45 feet.
- Multiple specialized terminals, including grain elevators, liquid-bulk (petroleum, molasses, chemicals), coal/coke handling, general cargo docks, and a dedicated inland-river (barge) terminal.
- Jurisdiction that spans about 85 miles of the Mississippi River, covering several parishes in Louisiana.

== Operations and Cargo ==
In 2022 the port handled approximately 73.4 million short tons, ranking it 8th among U.S. ports by tonnage. The cargo carried through the port includes agricultural products (grain, sugar), forest and biomass products, petroleum and chemical products, coal and coke, steel, pipe, lumber, and general bulk or breakbulk cargo.

== Governance ==
The Port is overseen by the Greater Baton Rouge Port Commission, established under state legislation in 1952. The commission is responsible for managing public docks, terminal operations, development of port infrastructure, and regulation of commerce within the port's jurisdiction.

== See also ==
- Mississippi River
- Gulf Intracoastal Waterway
- List of ports in the United States
