= Fort San Felipe =

Fort San Felipe may refer to:

- Fort San Felipe (Cavite), Philippines
- Fortaleza San Felipe in Puerto Plata, Dominican Republic on Hispaniola - the oldest fortress in the New World.
- Fort San Felipe del Morro, San Juan, Puerto Rico
- Fort San Felipe, Santa Elena (Spanish Florida), burned down 1576
- Fort St. Philip, Plaquemines Parish, Louisiana
