= Daniel Carmick =

US Marine Corps officer (1773–1816)

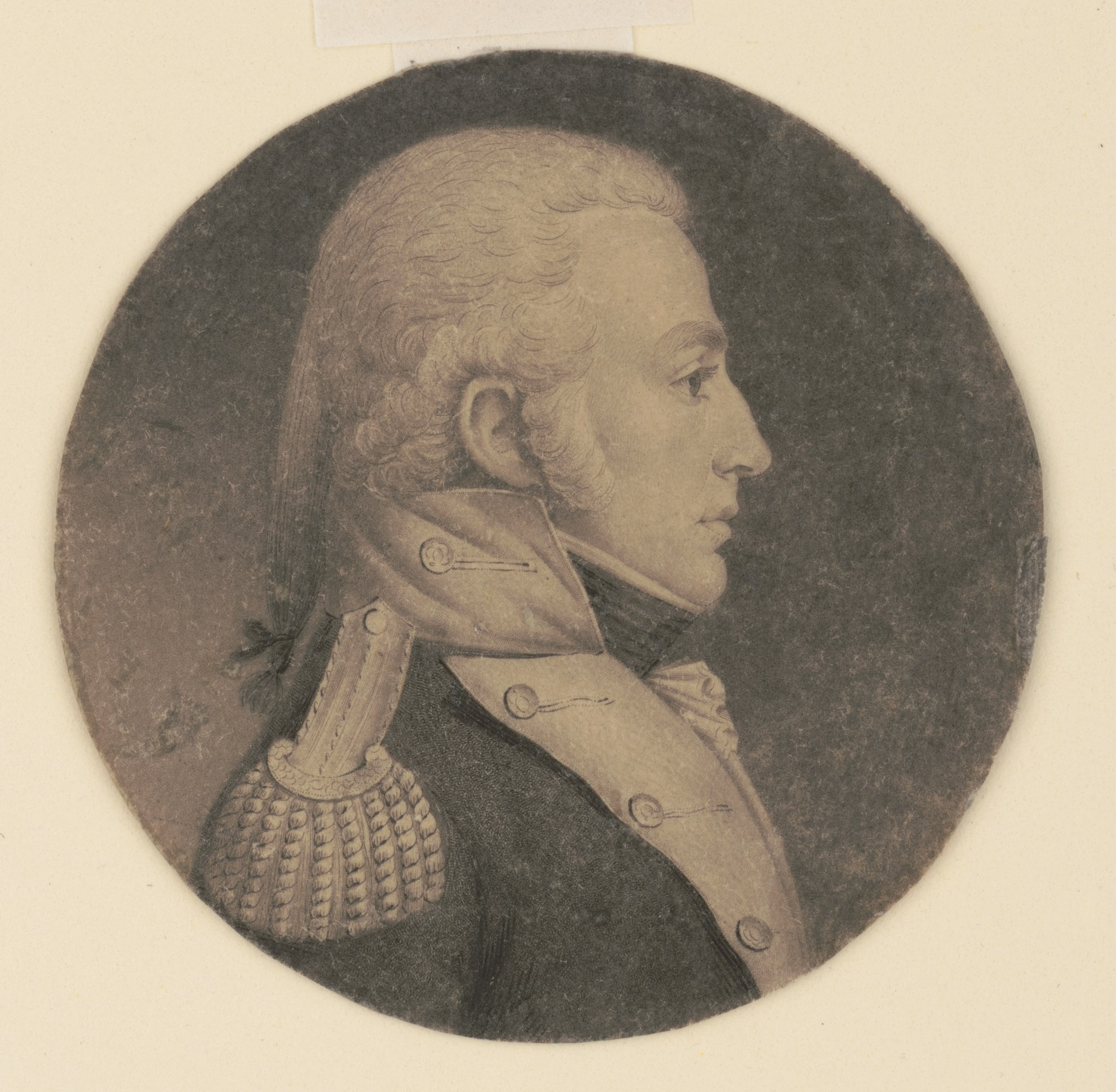
- Daniel Carmick, head-and-shoulders portrait. 1798
- Born: April 4, 1773; Philadelphia, Pennsylvania, British America
- Died: November 6, 1816 (aged 43) New Orleans, Louisiana, U.S.
- Allegiance: United States
- Branch: Marine Corps
- Rank: Major
- Conflicts: Quasi-War; Battle of Puerto Plata Harbor; War of 1812; Skirmish before the Battle of New Orleans (WIA)

Daniel Carmick (April 4, 1773 – November 6, 1816) was an officer in the United States Marine Corps.

== Biography ==
Born in Philadelphia, Province of Pennsylvania in 1773, Carmick was appointed a lieutenant of Marines for service on the USS Ganges on May 5, 1798. When the Ganges returned to port in New York, he was promoted to captain in the newly formed United States Marine Corps on July 11, 1798, the third ranking officer of the Corps. During the Quasi-War with France, he escorted French prisoners to Pennsylvania, then was ordered to guard Naval stores in New York and in June 1799, he was transferred to the USS Constitution. In May 1800 The Constitution sailed for the West Indies, where Carmick led his Marines in a "Trojan Horse" attack to capture the French privateer ship Sandwich at Puerto Plata in Hispaniola. He then sailed the Sandwich around to the eastern part of the harbor where his Marines spiked the guns of the fort Fortaleza San Felipe.

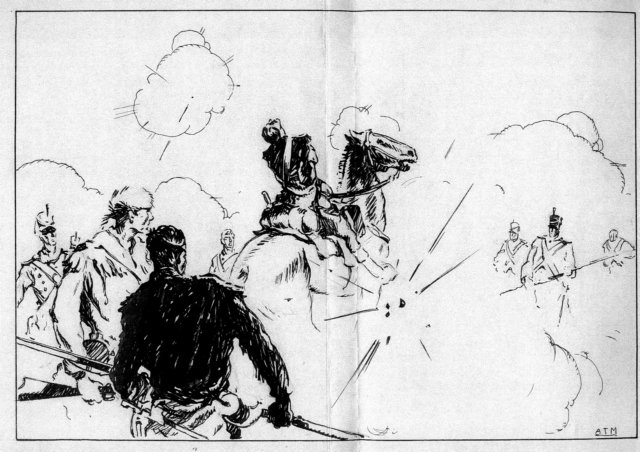
Daniel Carmick hit by a British rocket at the Battle of New Orleans. 29 December 1814.

In January 1802, he served with distinction aboard the frigate Chesapeake, conducting blockade and convoy actions in the Mediterranean. After a year of service on the Chesapeake, he was furloughed until January 1804 when he was ordered to lead a detachment of Marines to the newly acquired Louisiana. In May 1805, Governor Claiborne sent him to Pensacola to deliver dispatches to Governor Juan Vicente Folch, proposing a U.S. mail route through Spanish held West Florida. On orders from Washington, he left New Orleans in August to command the Marine Barracks in Philadelphia, but after a court martial hearing over disrespecting his commanding officer, he returned to New Orleans in the beginning of 1807. In August, he was put in command of the barracks in Washington.

When James Madison was elected President in 1809, he greatly expanded the scope of the Marine Corps, and the garrison in New Orleans was brought up to 300. On March 7, Carmick was promoted to Major and sent back to New Orleans for a third time. With war against England expected to start soon, Carmick requested to be relieved of duty and given a more active role in the upcoming war, but this was denied by Secretary of the Navy Paul Hamilton, citing the need for experienced officers in an area of such strategic importance. After the British had taken control of Lake Borgne in early December, they marched their troops inland and set up camp 9 miles south of New Orleans. On the night of December 23, Colonel Andrew Jackson ordered an attack on the British camp. Carmick took command of Major Plauché Battalion of Orleans, while his Marine detachment of 50 men were commanded by First lieutenant Francis Barbin de Bellevue, a creole native to New Orleans who was commissioned into the Marine Corps. After the attack, Jackson ordered his men to retreat and form a defensive line behind Rodriguez canal. On December 28, the British attacked the American line in an hours long artillery duel. Carmick, still in temporary command of the Battalion of Orleans, was on horseback to deliver an order to Major Plauché during the battle when a congreve rocket struck him. His horse was 'blown to pieces' and he was severely injured in the arm and head. He was rushed to a nearby hospital where he remained for the rest of the battle.

Carmick married Margaret O'Brien Cowperthwait on March 4, 1815, while he was still recovering from his wounds. He never fully recovered and died on November 6, 1816, due to his injuries. At that time, Carmick was the "second highest ranking officer in the United States Marine Corps." He is buried in Saint Louis Cemetery Number 2 in New Orleans.

== Legacy ==
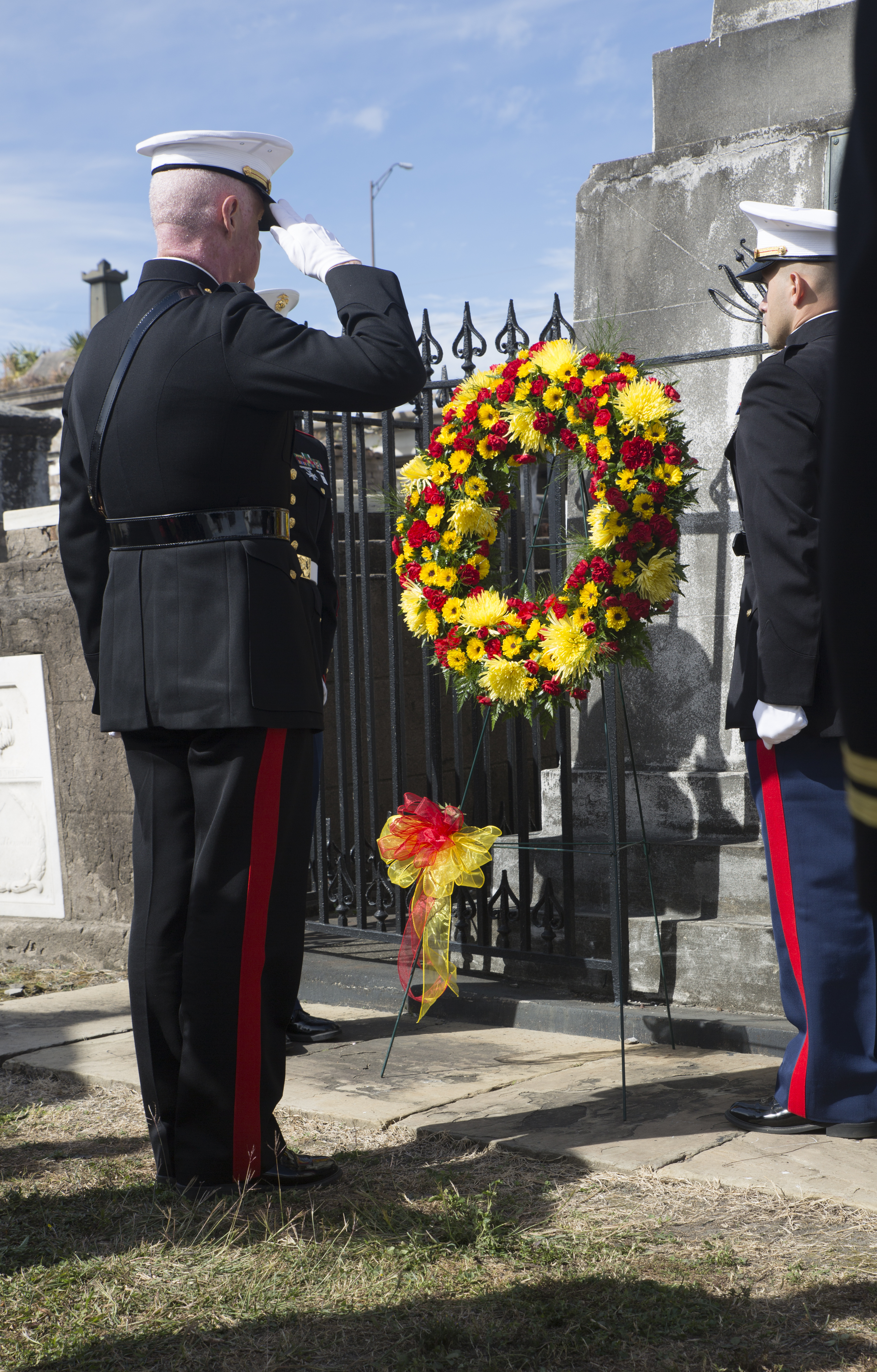
Lt. Gen. Richard P. Mills (left), commander of Marine Forces Reserve salutes the gravesite of Maj. Daniel Carmick in a wreath-laying ceremony at the St. Louis Cemetery #2 in New Orleans, Nov. 8, 2014

In 1942, the destroyer USS Carmick (DD-493) was named in is honor.

Marine Corps ceremonies were held at Major Carmick's tomb in conjunction with the Marine Corps "birthday" celebration, November, 2012. Carmick's contributions to his fledgling country and Corps have escaped well-deserved scrutiny. He participated in the U.S. Marine Corps' first landing on foreign soil on May 11, 1800, * (See Note Below) is credited with helping to establish the term "leatherneck" in reference to Marines, and apparently had issues with authority (the Commandant of the Marine Corps, which was a position Carmick felt he himself deserved), eventually being acquitted by a court martial and having his command returned to him.

(*) Note: The Continental Marine Corps conducted three foreign-shore landings during the American Revolutionary War; 1) Nassau, New Providence Island, Bahamas on March 3, 1776 (Marine Battalion, Commodore Esek Hopkins Squadron, Continental Navy) and 2) again on January 28, 1778 (Marine Detachment, Continental sloop Providence) as well as 3) a raid on Whitehaven, Great Britain on April 23, 1778 (Marine Detachment, Continental sloop Ranger). In addition, South Carolina Marines (Marine Detachment, South Carolina Navy frigate South Carolina commanded by Commodore Alexander Gillon) also landed on New Providence Island on May 8, 1782, while conducting joint operations with the Spanish Navy to assist in securing the Bahamas for Spain.

== See also ==
- James Sterrett
