= Maimón, Puerto Plata =

Maimón Bahia de Maimón
- Location within the Dominican Republic
- Coordinates: 19°48′0″N 70°47′24″W
- Country: Dominican Republic
- Province: Puerto Plata
- Municipality: Puerto Plata

Population (2010)
  - Total: 21,725
- Time zone: UTC-5

Maimón (also called Bahia de Maimón; lit. 'Maimón Bay') is a small resort town in Puerto Plata municipality in the Puerto Plata Province of the Dominican Republic. It is located around 24 km (15 mi) west of the city of Puerto Plata. Maimón is a "Natural Monument" in the Dominican Republic; these are areas protected by the Government due to having unique natural aspects or a significant cultural value including caves, areas with monuments or ruins of historical value.

It is home to a 3-hotel RIU complex, which opened in 1998; the hotel complex is in a separate zone to the town itself, which means the Maimón residents do not get many of the benefits the tourism income provides.

RIU hotels are a principal employer for this region, 75% are from Maimón and the other 25% are from other parts of the Maimón region. RIU hotels are committed to this area and they advertise jobs in newspapers in this area.

Sunset on Maimón beach
