= Battle of Puerto Plata Harbor =

1800 naval battle of the Quasi-War

- Part of the Quasi-War
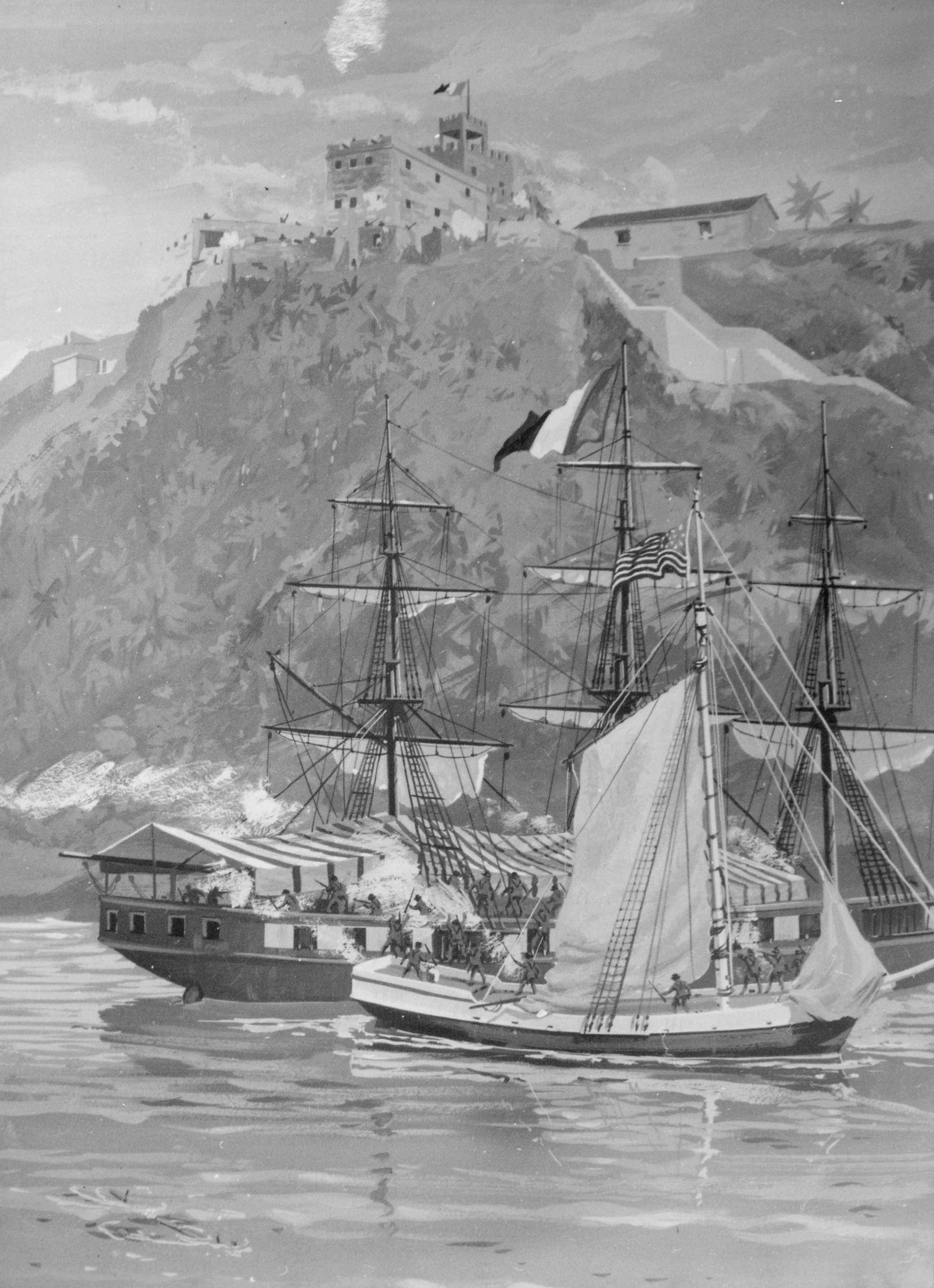
- Capture of the French Privateer Sandwich by armed Marines on the Sloop Sally, from the U.S. Frigate Constitution, Philip Colprit
Date	May 11, 1800
Location	Puerto Plata, Santo Domingo
Result	American victory

Belligerents
United States	France; Spain (Santo Domingo)

Commanders and leaders
Silas Talbot; Isaac Hull; Daniel Carmick	Unknown

Strength
100 marines and sailors 1 sloop	1 French corvette 1 Spanish fort

Casualties and losses
Unknown	1 corvette captured 1 fort captured

The Battle of Puerto Plata Harbor took place in 1800 with France and Spain on one side, and the United States on the other, during the undeclared Quasi-War officially between the French First Republic and the United States.

American forces landed about a hundred troops and sailors from USS Sally in Puerto Plata and boarded the French corvette Sandwich anchored there, which surrendered after a brief firefight. U.S. Marines then assaulted the Spanish Army's Fortaleza San Felipe; after another brief firefight, the fort was overrun and its cannons were spiked.

== Battle ==
In early May 1800, Captain Silas Talbot organized a naval expedition to Puerto Plata on the island of Hispaniola. His objective was to reduce French privateering. Having captured the small French sloops Sally and Ester, USS Constitution arrived outside Puerto Plata. The French privateer Sandwich was known to be at anchor in the harbor.

Talbot offloaded from USS Constitution a landing force of about 100 marines and sailors, onto the prize sloop Sally under the command of Lt. Isaac Hull. Hull, with the force hidden below deck, brought Sally into harbor and alongside an unsuspecting Sandwich. The French were no doubt shocked at the approaching American force and hardly put up a fight; Sandwich was captured in minutes. Then the Americans turned their attention on Fortaleza San Felipe, a Spanish fort whose guns covered the two ships. After another brief fight, the fort's defenses were overrun and the marines spiked the fort's cannons.

With the capture of Sandwich and the assault on the coastal fort, U.S. forces returned to their ships and sailed home. The Battle of Puerto Plata Harbor was one of the few land battles during the Quasi-War. Later the United States government would have to disavow Talbot's raid as it was an attack on a neutral party (Spain) and against a neutral military force (the fort).

== Bibliography ==
- Abbot, Willis J. (1896). The Naval History of the United States. Vol. 1. Peter Fenelon Collier. OCLC 3453791.
- Benjamin Armstrong, Small Boats and Daring Men: Maritime Raiding, Irregular Warfare, and the Early American Navy, (University of Oklahoma Press, 2019)
