= Puerto Plata =

Puerto Plata San Felipe de Puerto Plata
- City
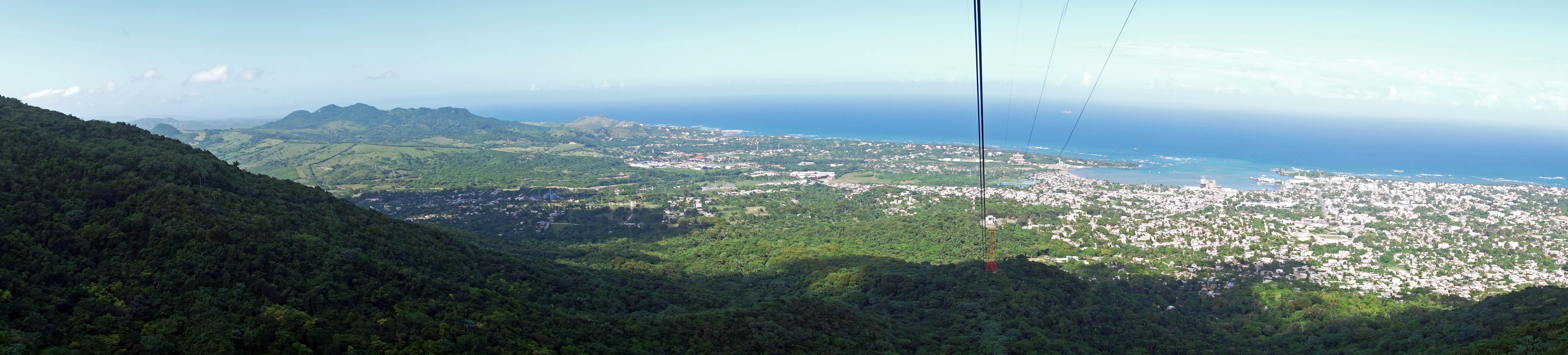
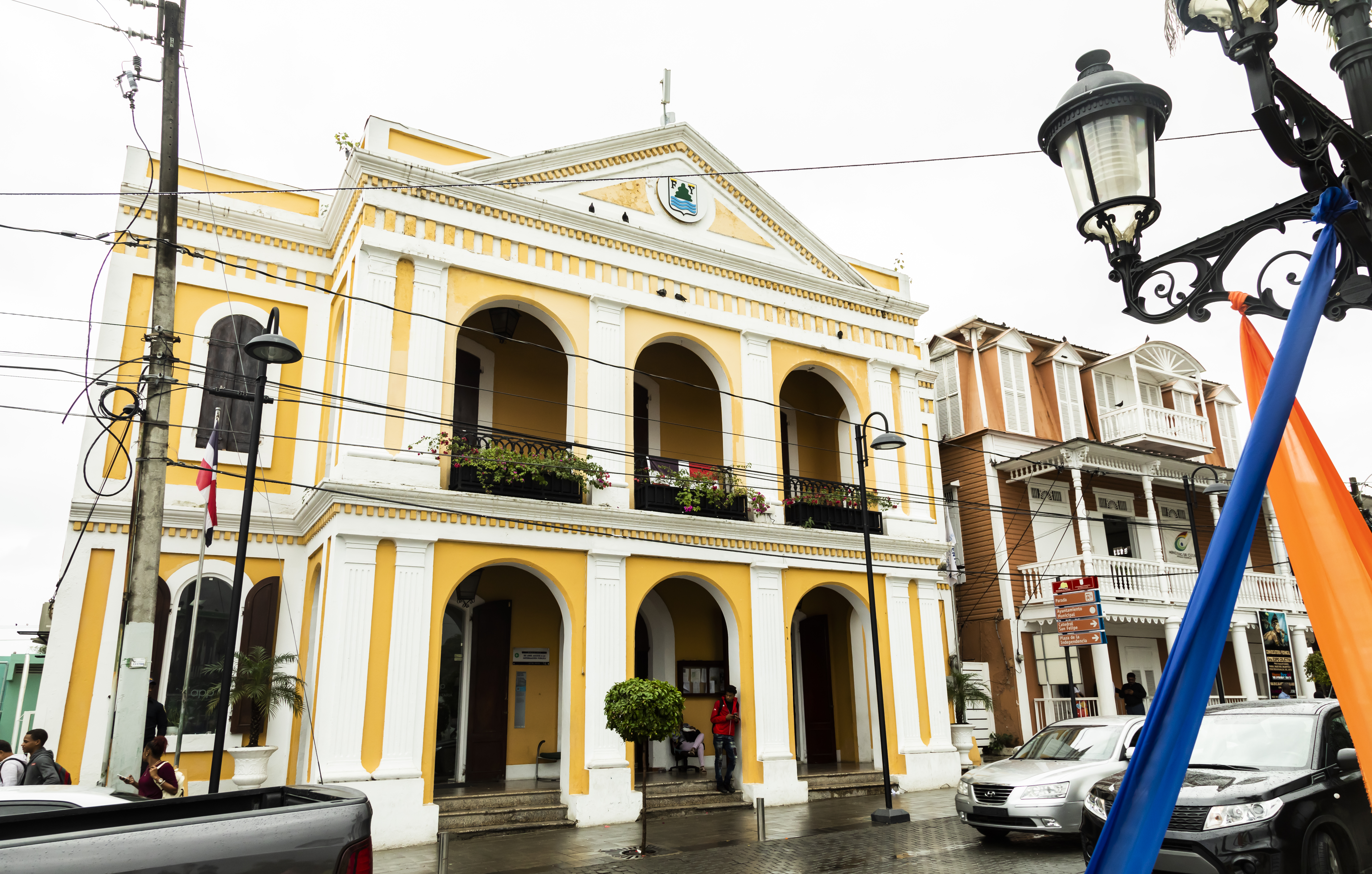
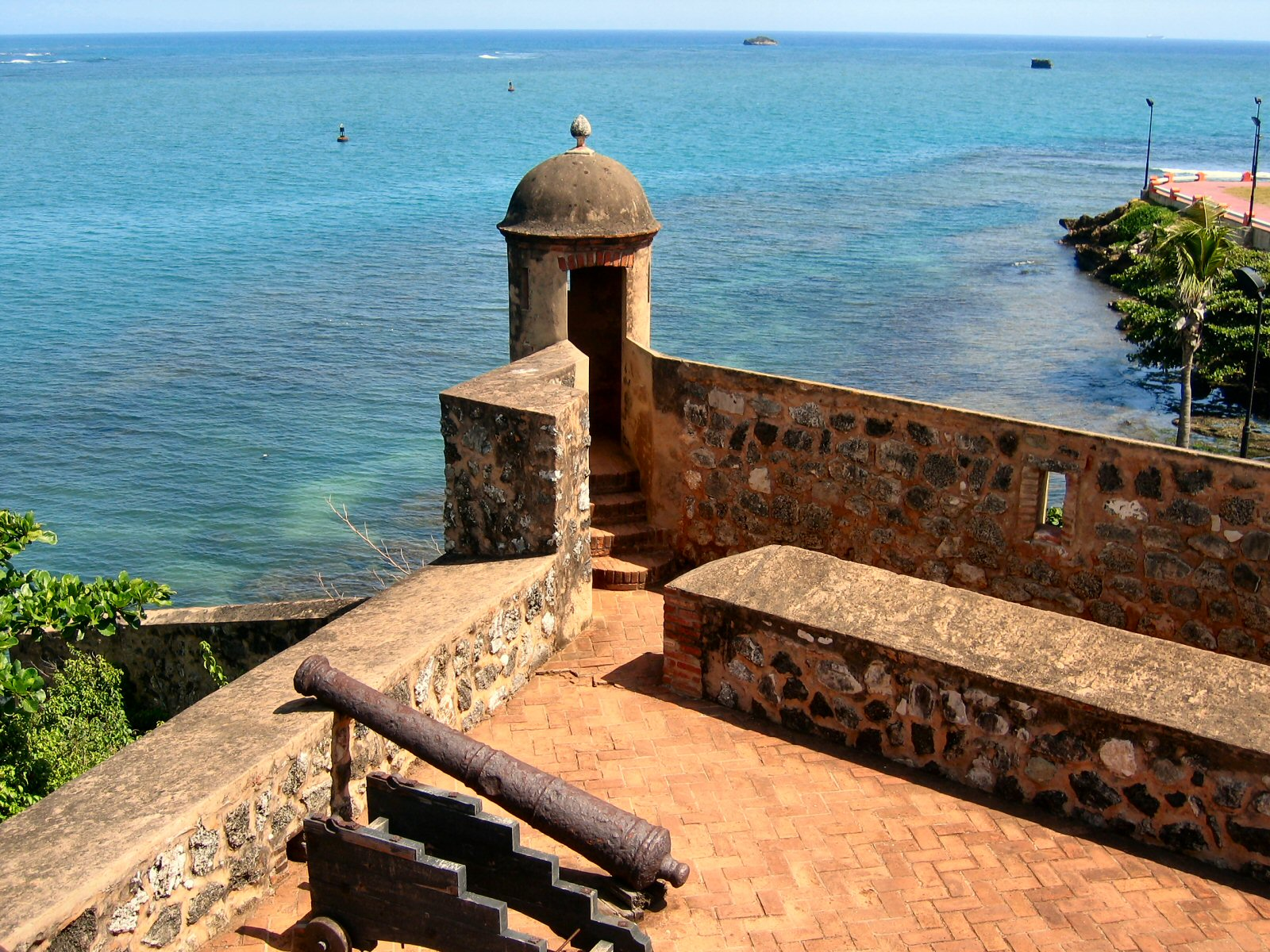
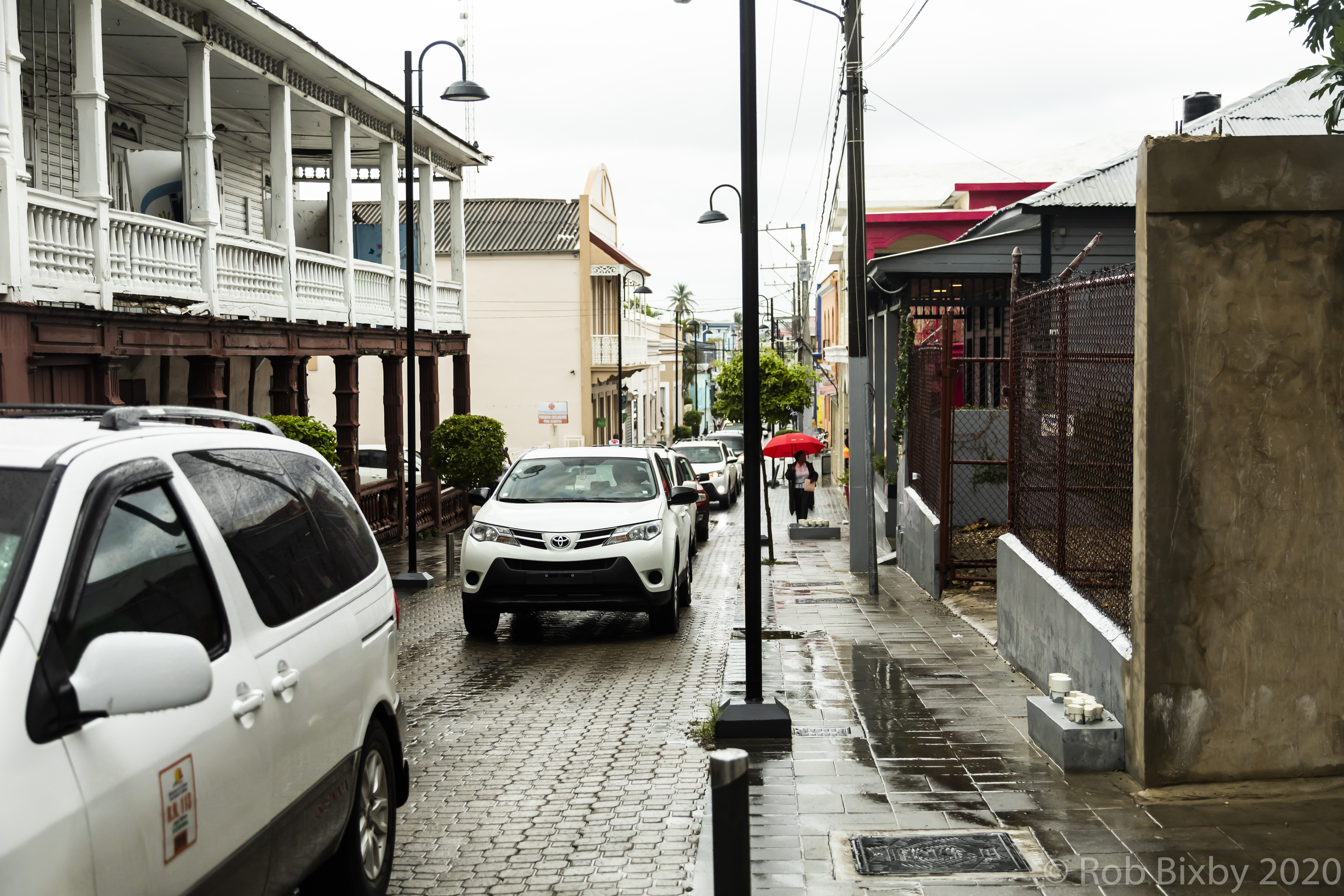
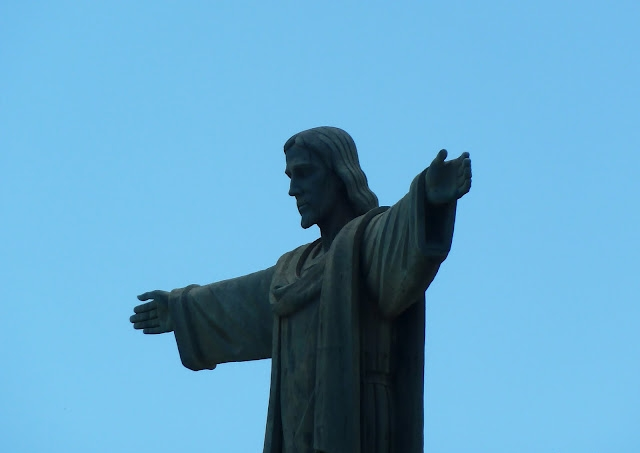
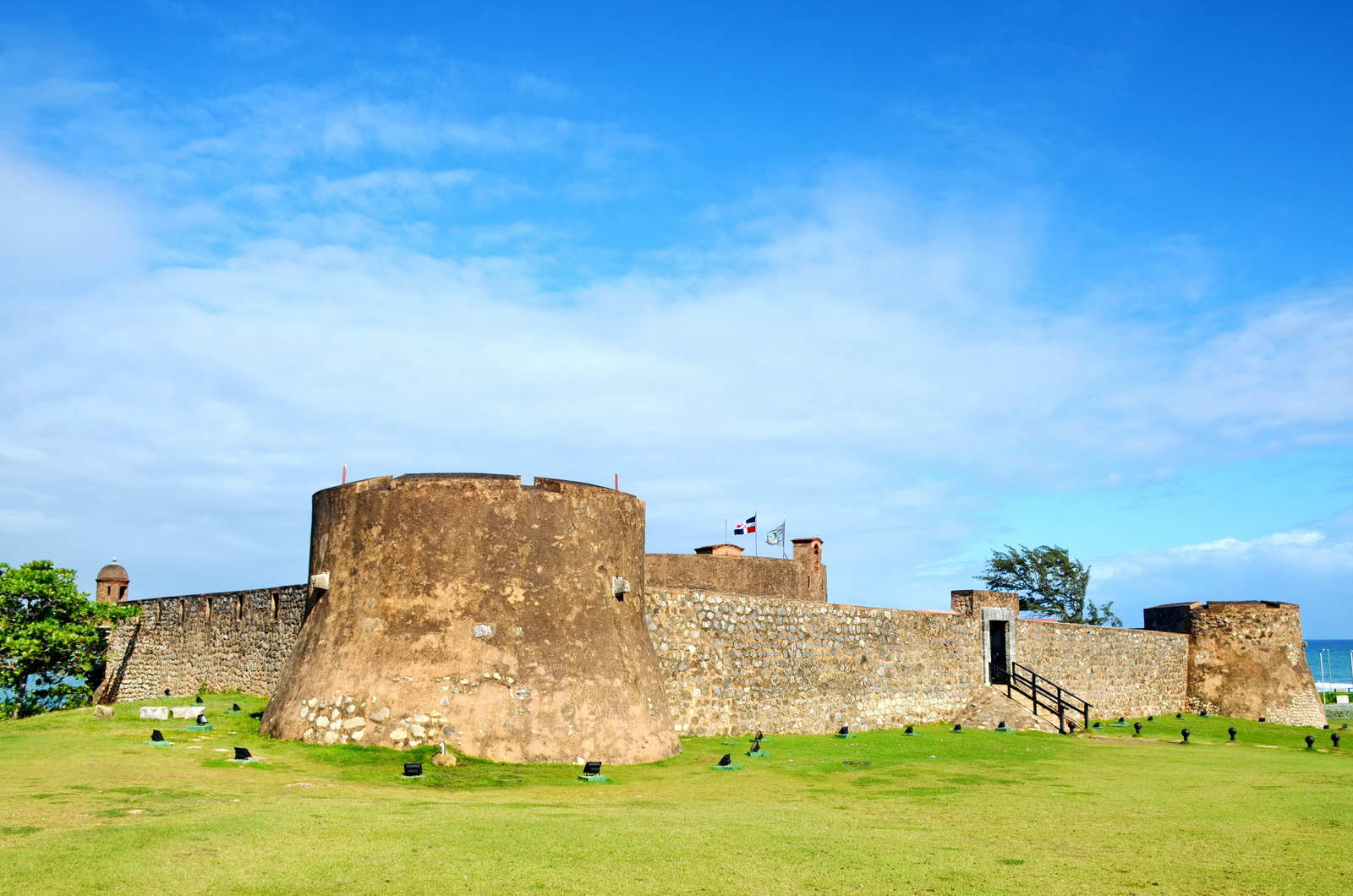
- From the top: Panoramic, Downtown, Fort, Street, Christ the Redeemer and San Felipe fort

- Flag Coat of arms
- Nickname: La tacita de plata (the little silver cup) La Novia del Atlántico (The Bride of the Atlantic)
- Puerto Plata in the Dominican Republic
- Coordinates: 19°47′14″N 70°41′30″W
- Country: Dominican Republic
- Province: Puerto Plata
- Founded: 1502
- Municipality since: 1844

Area
  - Total: 509.01 km^{2} (196.53 sq mi)
- Elevation: 8 m (26 ft)

Population (2022 census)
  - Total: 162,093
  - Density: 318.45/km^{2} (824.78/sq mi)
  - Demonym: Puertoplateño(a)
- Time zone: UTC−04:00 (AST)
- Distance to – Santo Domingo: 215 km (134 mi)
- Municipal Districts: 2
- Website: www.puertoplata.com

Puerto Plata, (Note: Spanish: puerto plata) officially known as San Felipe de Puerto Plata; (French: Port-de-Plate) is a major coastal city in the Dominican Republic, and capital of the Puerto Plata Province. The city is a major trading port as well as a tourism hub; Puerto Plata has resorts such as Playa Dorada and Costa Dorada, which are located east of the city proper. There are 100,000 hotel beds in the city. The first aerial tramway of the Caribbean is located in Puerto Plata, in which visitors can ride up to the Pico Isabel de Torres, a 793-meter (2600-foot) high mountain within the city.

The city's history dates back to the early 16th century, when Spanish colonists founded a small colonial settlement in the region. During the first decades of the existence of the Captaincy General of Santo Domingo, the settlement was considered the main commercial and maritime port of the island. In 1605, it was depopulated and destroyed during the Devastations of Osorio to counter raids by privateers and pirates. A hundred years later, the city was repopulated with farmers from the Canary Islands. From 1822 to 1844 the city was under Haitian control. From 1844 on began the period of the republic, in which the city began to recover its maritime and commercial boom. Beginning in 1865, the current Puerto Plata began to be built with much of its current architecture and a popular tourist destination. By the end of the 19th century, Puerto Plata had become important for its cultural, social, maritime, and economic development.

== Geography ==
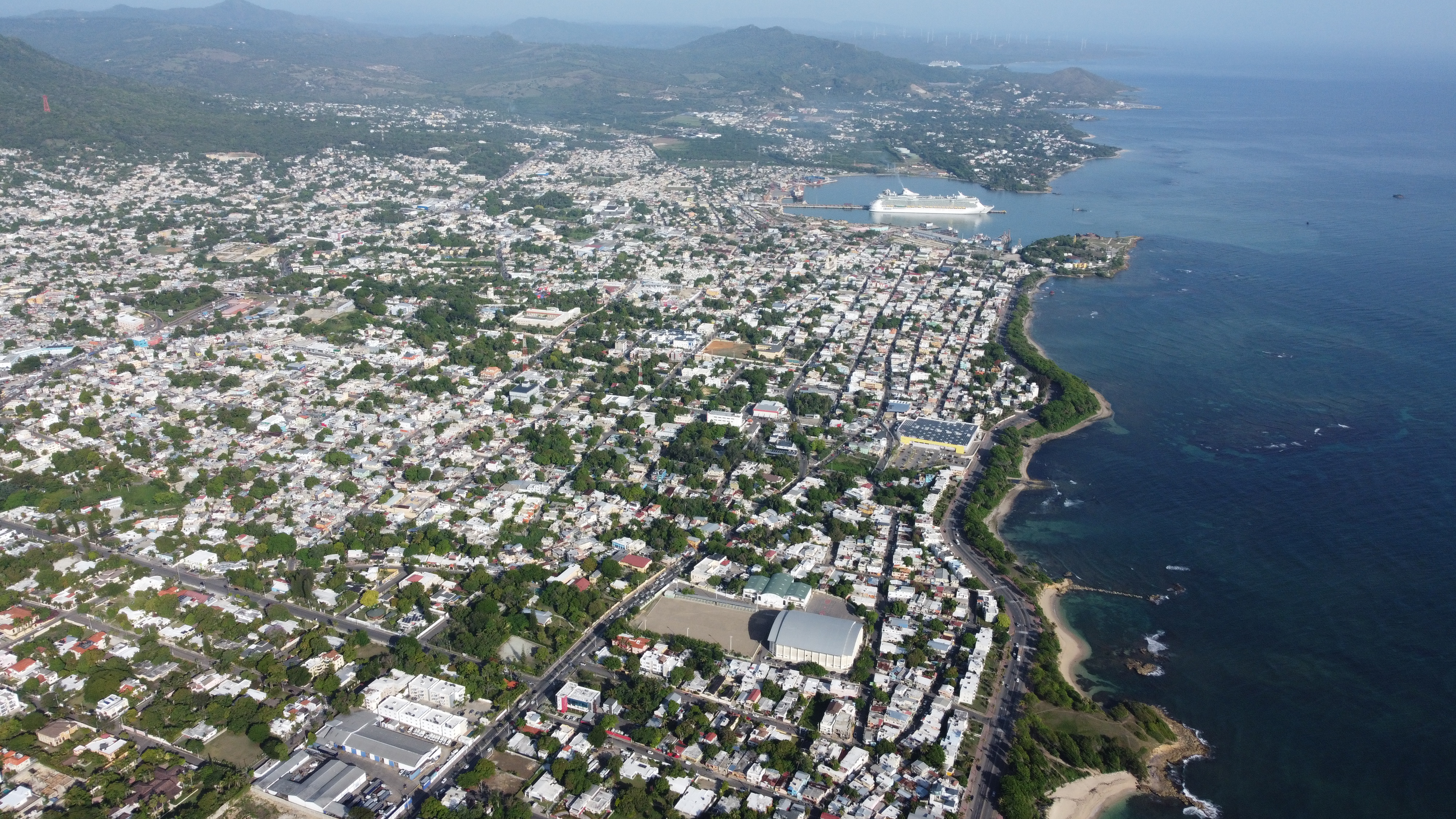
View of Puerto Plata

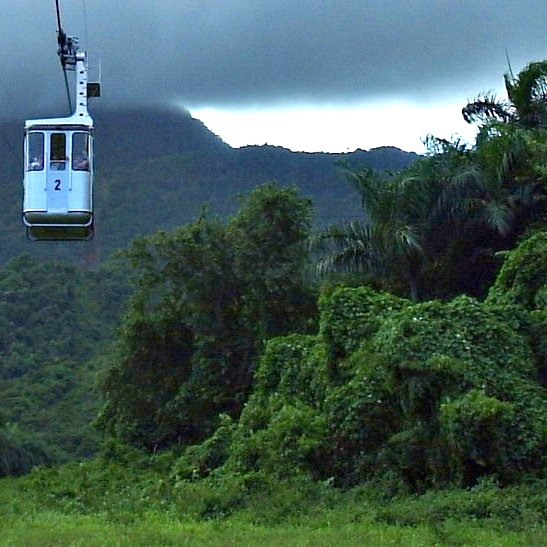
Tramway of Puerto Plata

The city sits on land that rises abruptly from the sea making it almost completely visible from the port. It is bordered on the north by the Atlantic Ocean and to the south and southwest by the hill Isabel de Torres.

The small bay around which the city was built provides a natural harbor. Puerto Plata is the largest city on the northern seaboard. Its subdivisions include: El Cupey, Maimón, Los Mameyes, Sabana Grande, El Toro, Tubagua and Yásica. The mountain Isabel de Torres is situated some 5 km to the southwest of the city of San Felipe. Geographically it forms part of the Cordillera Septentrional, reaching a maximum height of 800 m above sea level. It is possible to drive to the top of the mountain by following the highway Don José Ginebra. The highway, upon leaving the city, continues west, passing the populated areas of San Marcos, Piedra Candela and El Cruce, arriving at a paved section that continues southeast and then leads directly to the top. The area surrounding Loma Isabel de Torres has been declared a National Monument with an area that covers approximately 20 km^{2}. At the summit there is a tropical botanical garden covering about 7 acres (28,000 m^{2}), featuring 600 varieties of tropical plants.

=== Hydrography ===
The most significant rivers are Camú del Norte, San Marcos, Corozo, Muñoz, Maimón, El Violón, San Piñez, Río Seco, as well as the streams Fú, Blanco, Caballo, Culebra and San Cristóbal.

== Climate ==
Puerto Plata has a tropical climate, more specifically a tropical monsoon climate, with hot, somewhat wet summers and warm, very wet winters (Köppen climate classification Am), due to its tropical location and the cold fronts that reach the region during the "winter" which typically brings the area humid, wetter weather.

Climate data for Gregorio Luperón International Airport [1991-2020]
Month	Jan	Feb	Mar	Apr	May	Jun	Jul	Aug	Sep	Oct	Nov	Dec	Year
Record high °C (°F)	32.5 (90.5)	33.3 (91.9)	33.9 (93.0)	34.6 (94.3)	35.0 (95.0)	36.7 (98.1)	37.8 (100.0)	37.8 (100.0)	40.0 (104.0)	35.6 (96.1)	34.4 (93.9)	32.5 (90.5)	40.0 (104.0)
Mean daily maximum °C (°F)	28.1 (82.6)	28.3 (82.9)	28.5 (83.3)	29.5 (85.1)	30.6 (87.1)	32.0 (89.6)	32.2 (90.0)	32.4 (90.3)	32.3 (90.1)	31.5 (88.7)	29.8 (85.6)	28.7 (83.7)	30.3 (86.5)
Daily mean °C (°F)	24.4 (75.9)	24.5 (76.1)	24.8 (76.6)	25.9 (78.6)	27.0 (80.6)	28.2 (82.8)	28.5 (83.3)	28.6 (83.5)	28.4 (83.1)	27.7 (81.9)	26.3 (79.3)	25.2 (77.4)	26.6 (79.9)
Mean daily minimum °C (°F)	20.7 (69.3)	20.8 (69.4)	21.1 (70.0)	22.3 (72.1)	23.5 (74.3)	24.4 (75.9)	24.8 (76.6)	24.8 (76.6)	24.4 (75.9)	24.0 (75.2)	22.7 (72.9)	21.6 (70.9)	22.9 (73.2)
Record low °C (°F)	9.4 (48.9)	10.0 (50.0)	11.6 (52.9)	12.2 (54.0)	14.4 (57.9)	15.0 (59.0)	13.3 (55.9)	15.6 (60.1)	16.1 (61.0)	15.6 (60.1)	14.4 (57.9)	12.2 (54.0)	9.4 (48.9)
Average rainfall mm (inches)	175 (6.9)	140 (5.5)	130 (5.1)	115 (4.5)	130 (5.1)	50 (2.0)	70 (2.8)	70 (2.8)	65 (2.6)	110 (4.3)	230 (9.1)	230 (9.1)	1,515 (59.8)
Average rainy days	12	9	8	10	11	6	7	7	7	10	14	15	116
Mean monthly sunshine hours	210	205	235	225	225	240	265	265	220	225	195	185	2,690
Source 1: https://www.climatestotravel.com/climate/dominican-republic
Source 2:

== Seal ==
In 1508, Serrano and Diego Nicuëza were sent to the Spanish court to beg the king to treat their cities as the cities in their home country. On December 6, 1508, the Spanish king granted the cities of Hispaniola their seal and their rights. For "Puerto de Plata", as it was called in those years, it was described as follows:

A silver shield with a green mountain, on it was also a golden F and Y crowned and on the top of this, silver and blue. The initials are for the King and Queen of the Spanish Empire, the Catholic Monarchs Fernando and Ysabel (now usually "Isabel").

== History ==
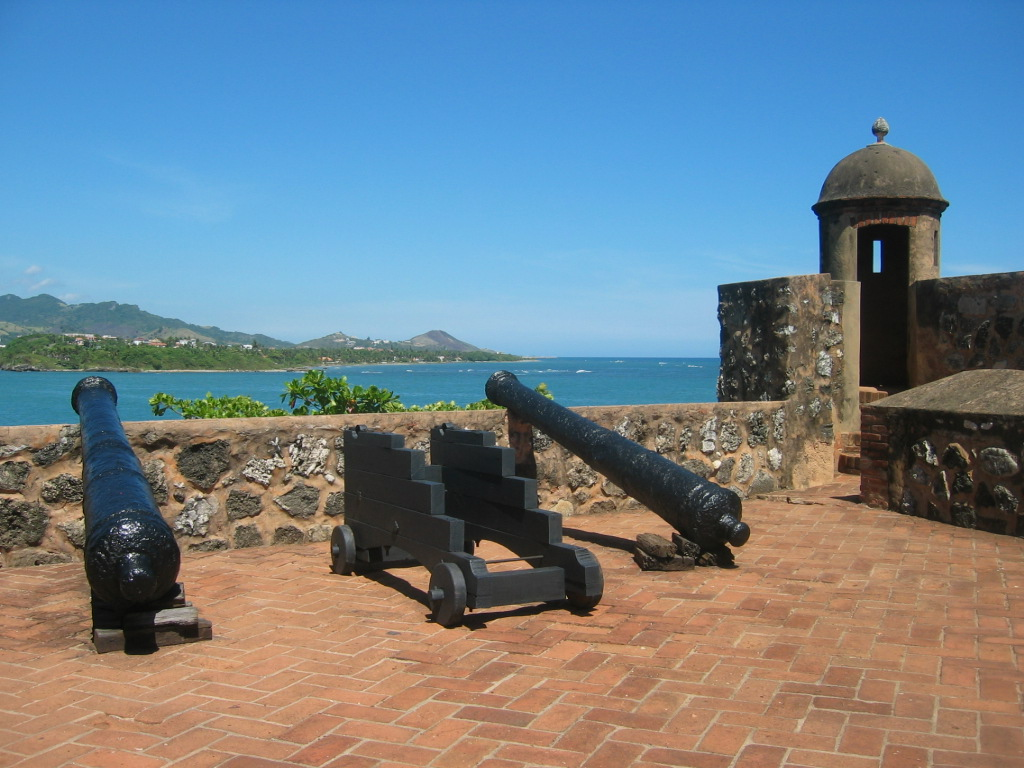
The Fortaleza San Felipe

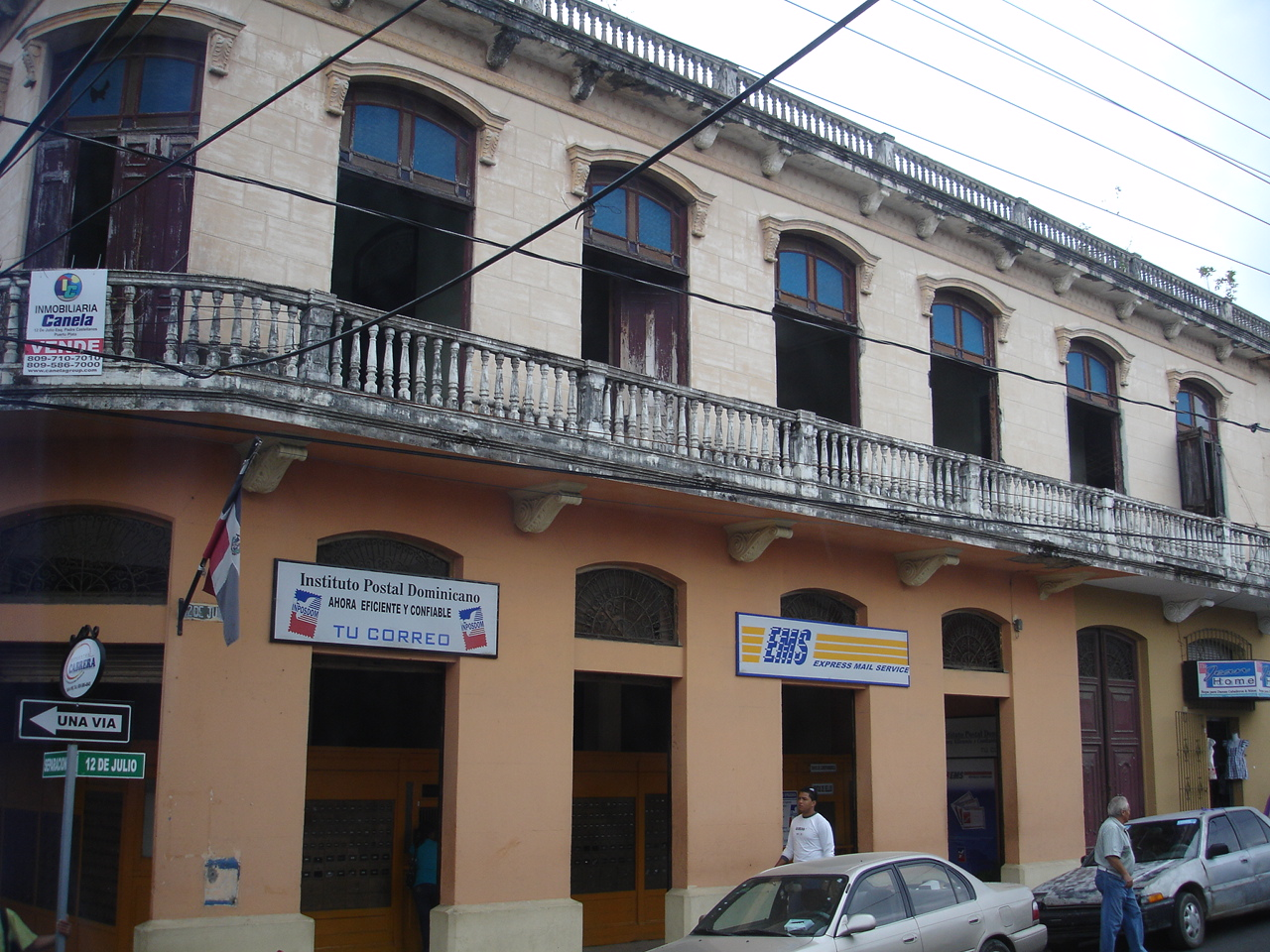
A post office in Puerto Plata

Since the founding of La Isabela, the first village in the New World, on January 2, 1494, Puerto Plata has been a town of firsts in the Americas. Historians are not clear on the exact year of Puerto Plata's founding. Emilio Rodríguez Demorizi, Américo Lugo, Jose Bordonada, and Samuel Hazard give the year 1502 as recorded by Nicolás of Ovando. Dr. Llenas affirmed that it was 1503. Dr. Joaquín Marino Incháustegui, in his Dominican history records, cites 1504. Dr. Manuel Arturo Roca Batlle indicates that the city was founded in 1505. The historians Alonso Rodriguez Demorizi (brother of Emilio) and Jacinto Gimbernard assert that it was in the year 1496, and Padre Español said it was in 1506.

Christopher Columbus, in his first trip, called the mountain Monte de Plata, observing that since the top is frequently foggy it had a silver-like appearance, hence the name of the port. The city was designed by the brothers Christopher and Bartolomé Columbus, in 1496. The aforementioned Nicolás de Ovando recorded a port existing in the northern coast of the island about 1502. In its first phase as a Spanish colony the town was considered the main commercial and maritime port of the island. Around 1555, Puerto Plata's importance as a port town was lost and it became one of the places of the Antilles frequented by pirates. In 1605 it was depopulated and destroyed by order of Philip III of Spain to counter raids by English privateers and pirates.

A hundred years later, the town was repopulated with farmers originating from the Canary Islands. During the Battle of Puerto Plata Harbor, the United States Marine Corps landed on the island and attacked a French ship and Fortaleza San Felipe. After capturing the French privateer Sandwich and spiking the guns at the fort, the Americans retired victorious. This was during the Quasi-War, an undeclared conflict between France and the United States from 1798 to 1800. From 1822 to 1844 the city was under Haitian control. From 1844 on began the period of the republic, in which the city began to recover its maritime and commercial boom.

The city grew under the influence of European immigrants, who left a cultural and social footprint that remains unique among other cities on the island. In 1863, during the Dominican Restoration War, the city was razed completely. Beginning in 1865, the current Puerto Plata began to be built, explaining the Victorian style of much of its current architecture. By the end of the 19th century, Puerto Plata had become important for its cultural, social, maritime, and economic development. In 1996, Birgenair Flight 301 crashed near Puerto Plata, killing all 189 people on board.

== Economy ==
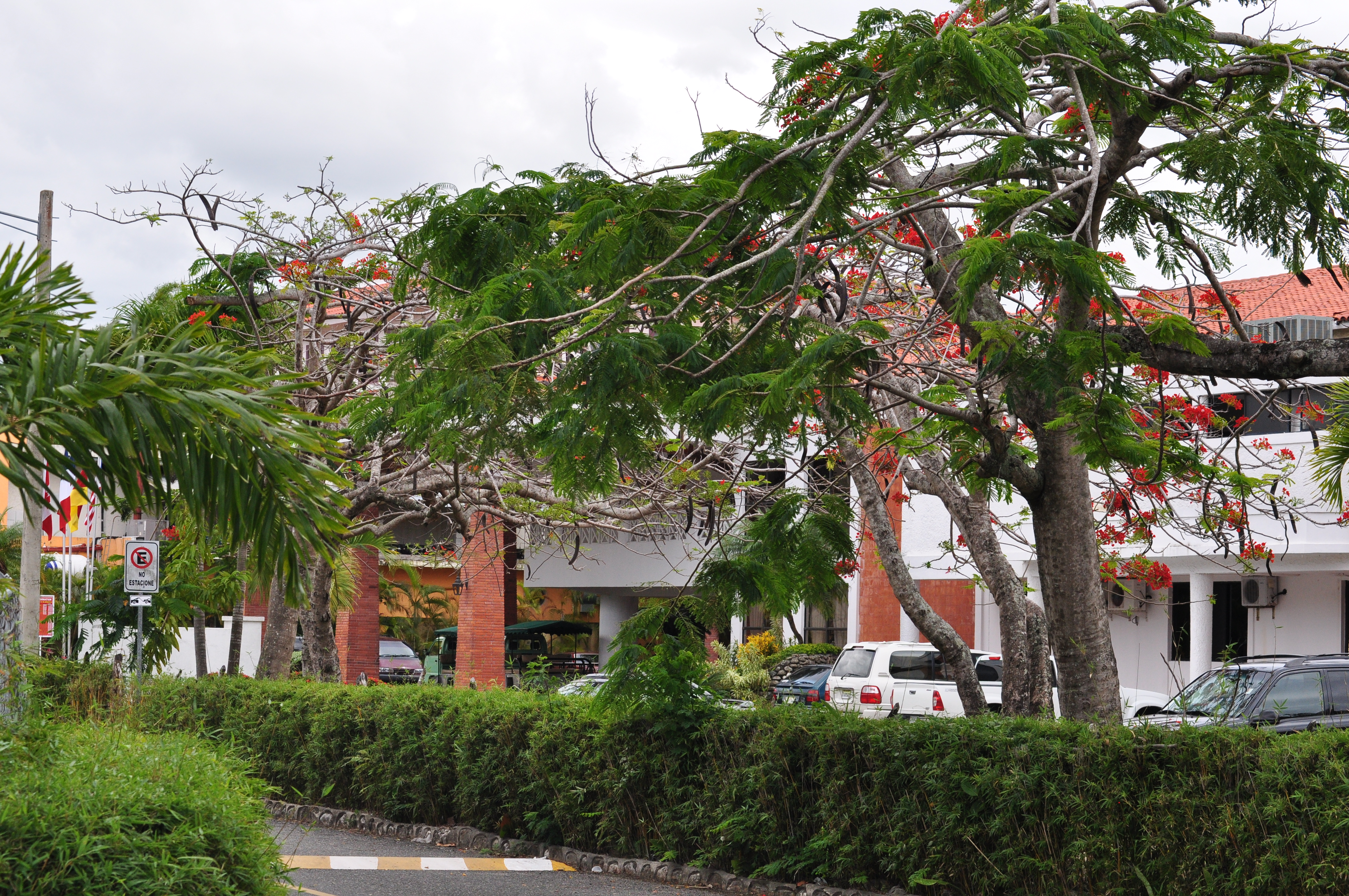
Puerto Plata, Dominican Republic streets.

The Municipality of San Felipe de Puerto Plata is prominent in agribusiness and tourism, making it a major contributor to the economic growth of the entire country. Other forms of income and economic development that serve to support some segments of the population include port management, sea vessel production, fishing, and textiles. The port has a significant impact in the national and provincial economy.

The port receives cruise ships as well as general bulk freighters which export a variety of merchandise, including farm products and manufactured products in the duty-free zones of the region. Taino Bay, a cruise terminal closer to the city than Carnival's Amber Cove is, opened in December 2021.

== Culture ==
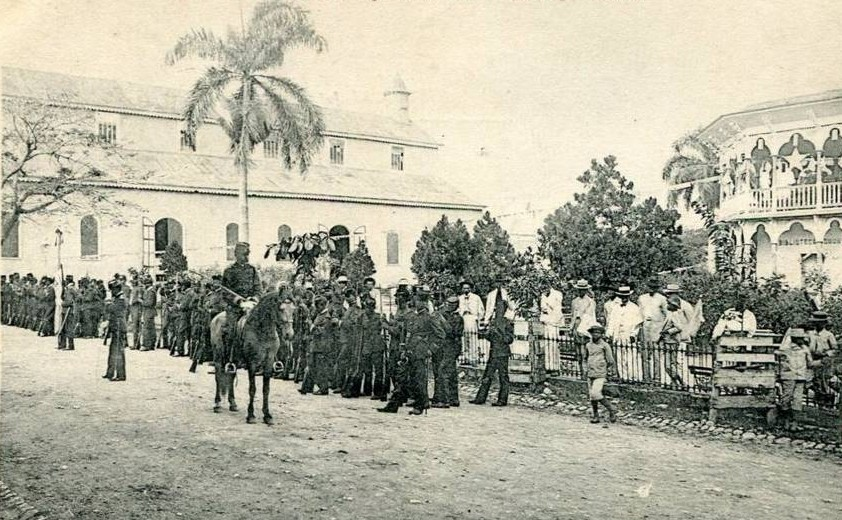
Puerto Plata in 1900.

The reports on the celebration of the carnival in the Puerto Plata date from the end of the 19th century. The central personage is the devil cojuelo, that in Puerto Plata becomes Taimáscaro, that produces deities Taínas in its masks, and a suit where elements of Spanish and culture are symbolized and the African essences, in multicolored tapes in its arms, and all that is complemented with the conches of the Atlantic Ocean, as natural elements of identity of the town Puertoplateño.

These festivities are celebrated during the months of February and March, in the avenue of the Jetty and the streets of the city. The people are entertained by the parades of disguises, the music, the popular dances, and the different demonstrations of the arts reflecting cultural identity. Each year the organizers of the carnival choose the King Momo, representing the city that has fought to maintain its traditions.

=== Architecture ===
The city of Puerto Plata is characterized by its dominant Victorian style architecture, combined with various other architectural styles, giving a varied character to the process of urban development. Inside this variety is the old style related to the colonial epoch, of which remains as an example the Fortress San Felipe.

Another it is the traditional style, originated when the city was founded by migrant canarios, and of the one that the balconies are inherited, and as an example is the bridge of the Guinea, of the year 1879. Then developed the Victorian model, because of the French, Italian, German, and English immigration, and from other European countries, which began after the Dominican Restoration War and had its height at the end of the 19th century and start of the 20th. This style was utilized in dwellings and in buildings destined for social activities. This type of construction gives its own image to the province.

Finally, Puerto Plata developed a modern architecture because of the American occupation (1916 and 1924), and continuing under Trujillo, based on cement block construction.

=== Downtown Puerto Plata ===
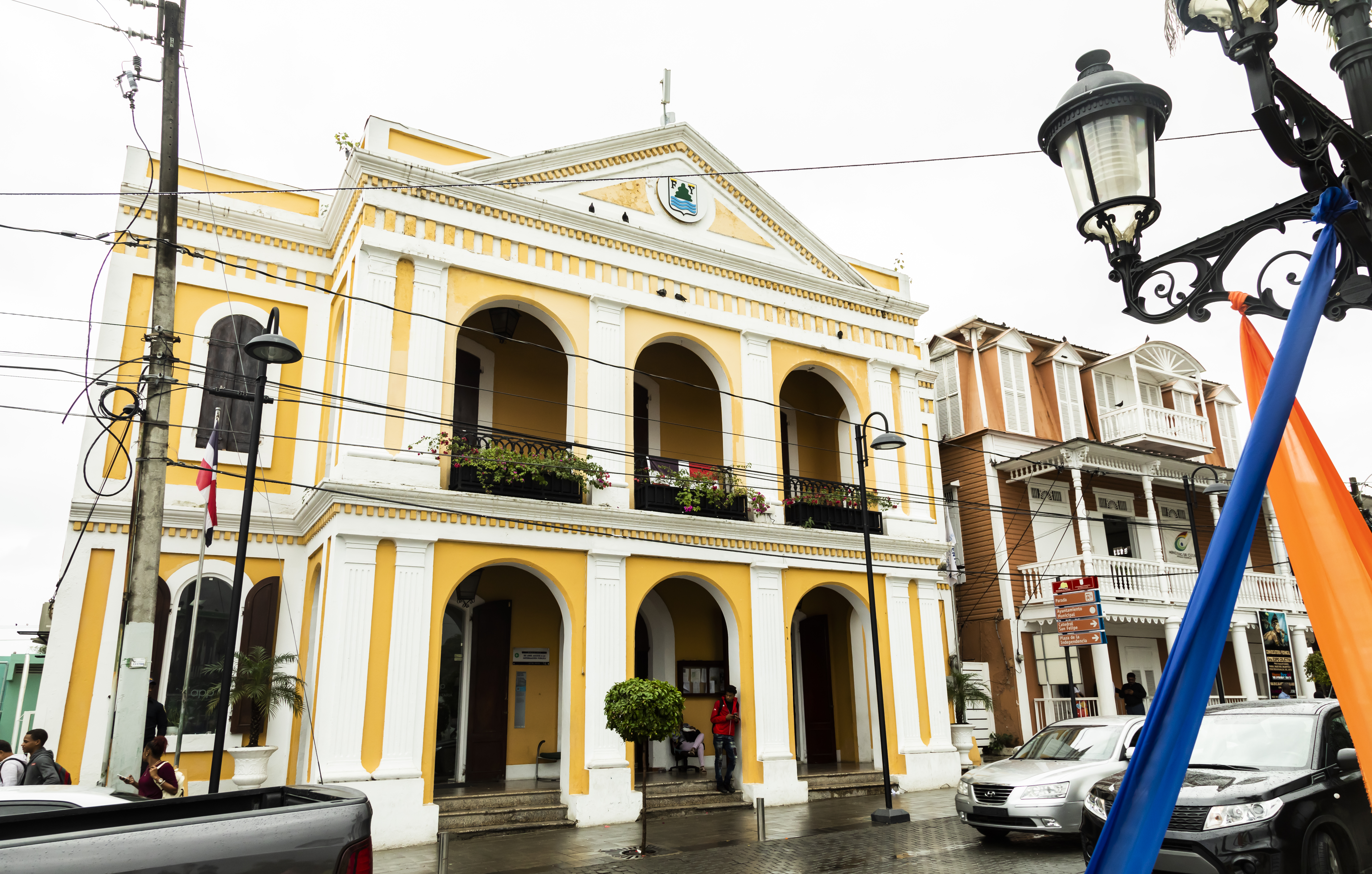

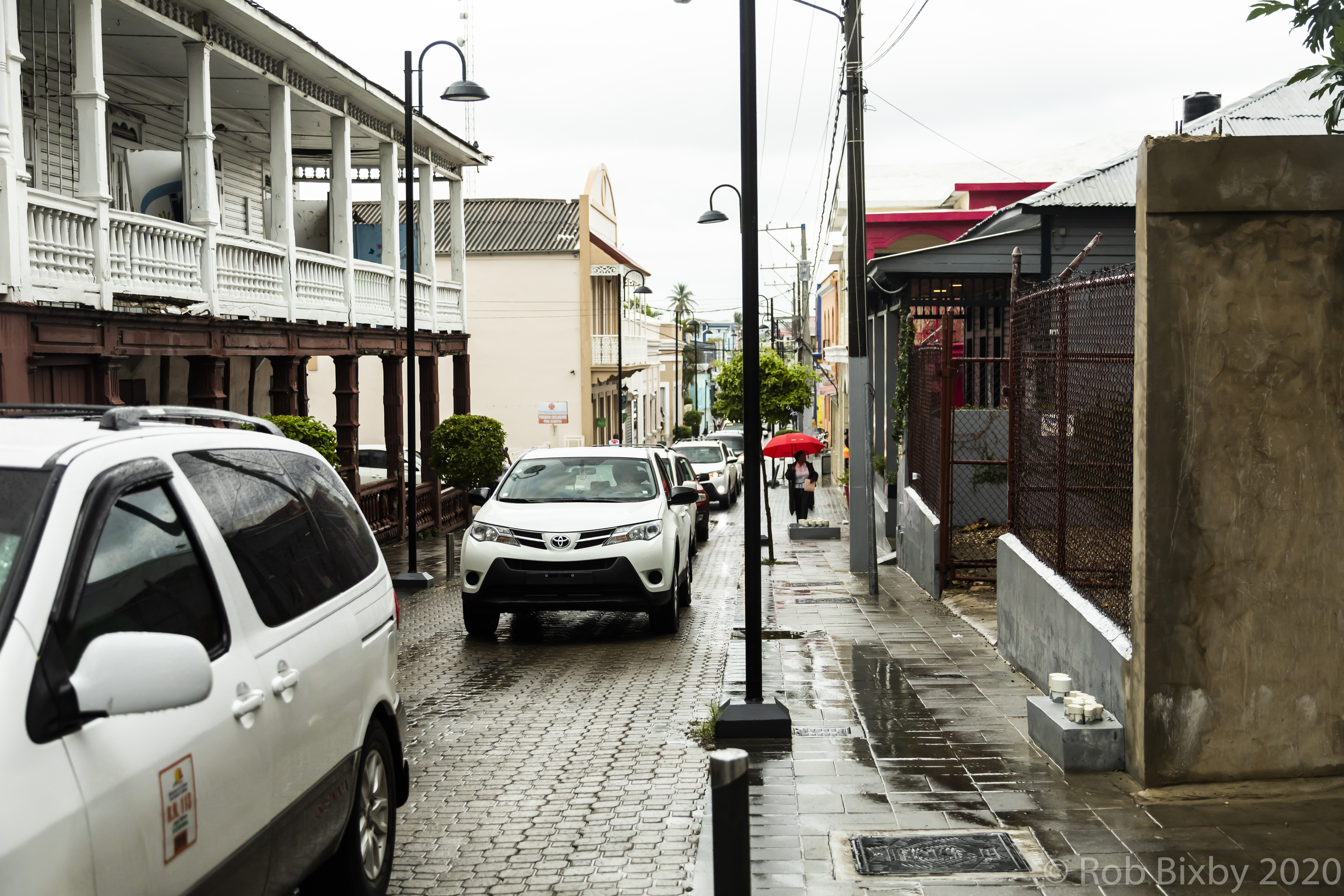

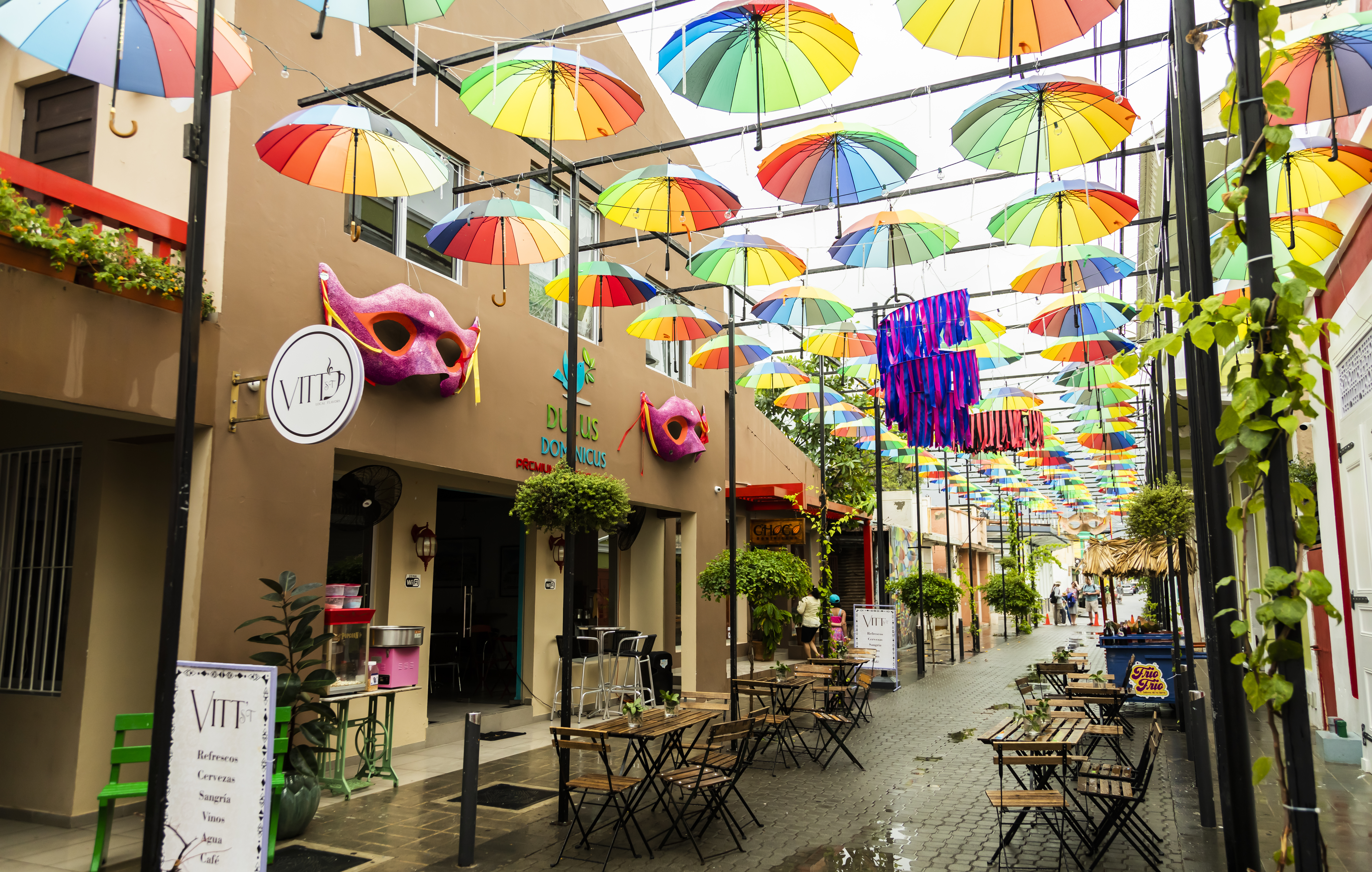

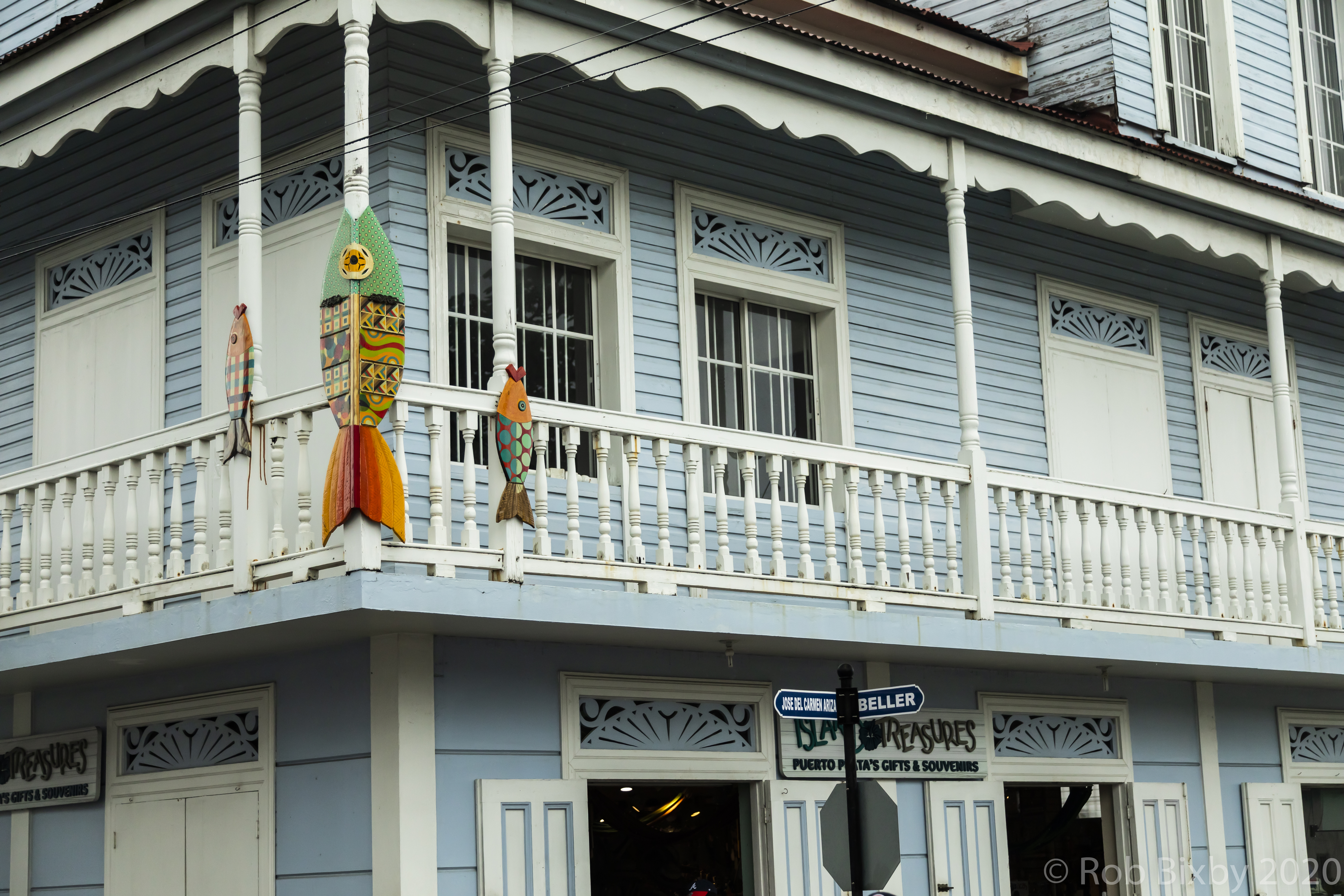

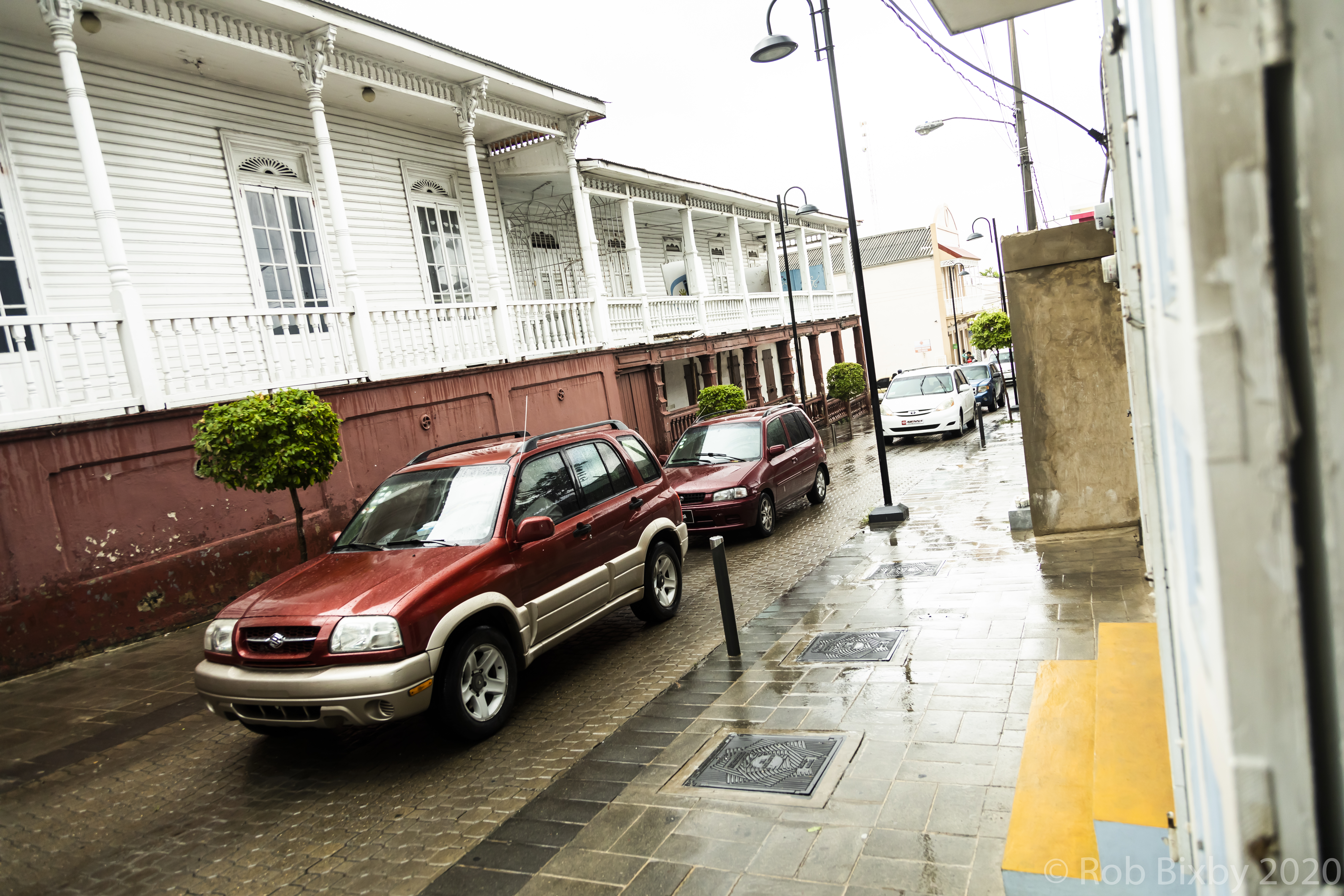

== Education ==
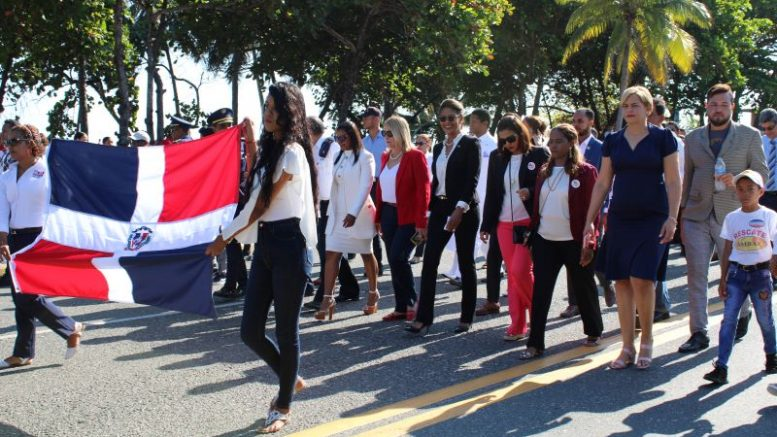
People in parade of Puerto Plata city, Dominican Republic.

Some of the educators who left a mark in the Puerto Plata education system include Antera Mota, Emilio Prud'Homme, Ana Isabel Jiménez, Mercedes Mota, José Dubeau, Doña Isabel Díaz-Alejo y Reyes, Doña Elvia Campillo, Isabel Meyreles, María Concepción Gómez Matos, among others. Currently, the municipality of San Felipe of Puerto Plata has 182 educational centers, of which the 67% correspond to the public sector and 39% to the private sector.

This municipality has a total of 29,279 students, of whom 1,567 are at the initial level, 19,395 at the basic level, 6,642 at the medium level, 1,505 students to the subsystem of adults, 84 students of special education and 86 of the labor school.

Besides the universities, four operations offer different careers of technical and upper degree. These universities are:

- Pontificia Universidad Católica Madre y Maestra (PUCMM)
- Universidad Organización y Método
- Universidad Tecnológica de Santiago (UTESA)
- Centro Universitario Regional del Atlántico de la Universidad Autónoma de Santo Domingo (CURA-UASD)

== Sports ==
Since the 1950s, the main sports institution of the municipality of San Felipe has been the League of the Atlantic one, which was founded on August 16, 1958, prompted by Fabio Rafael González. This institution celebrates activities during all the year, mainly baseball, and years later added basketball, with the time various clubs were incorporated; the Gustavo Behall, the Hugo Kunhard, and Juan Luis Plá, among others. Since the 1970, the main activities have been the school events that are celebrated during all the year, in its respective dates in which competes in the different disciplines. At present, in Golden Beach, Brugal & Company celebrates periodically the Club Golf Puerto Plata tournament, with the participation of the most noticeable athletes of this discipline, so much at the local level, as national and international.

== Tourism ==
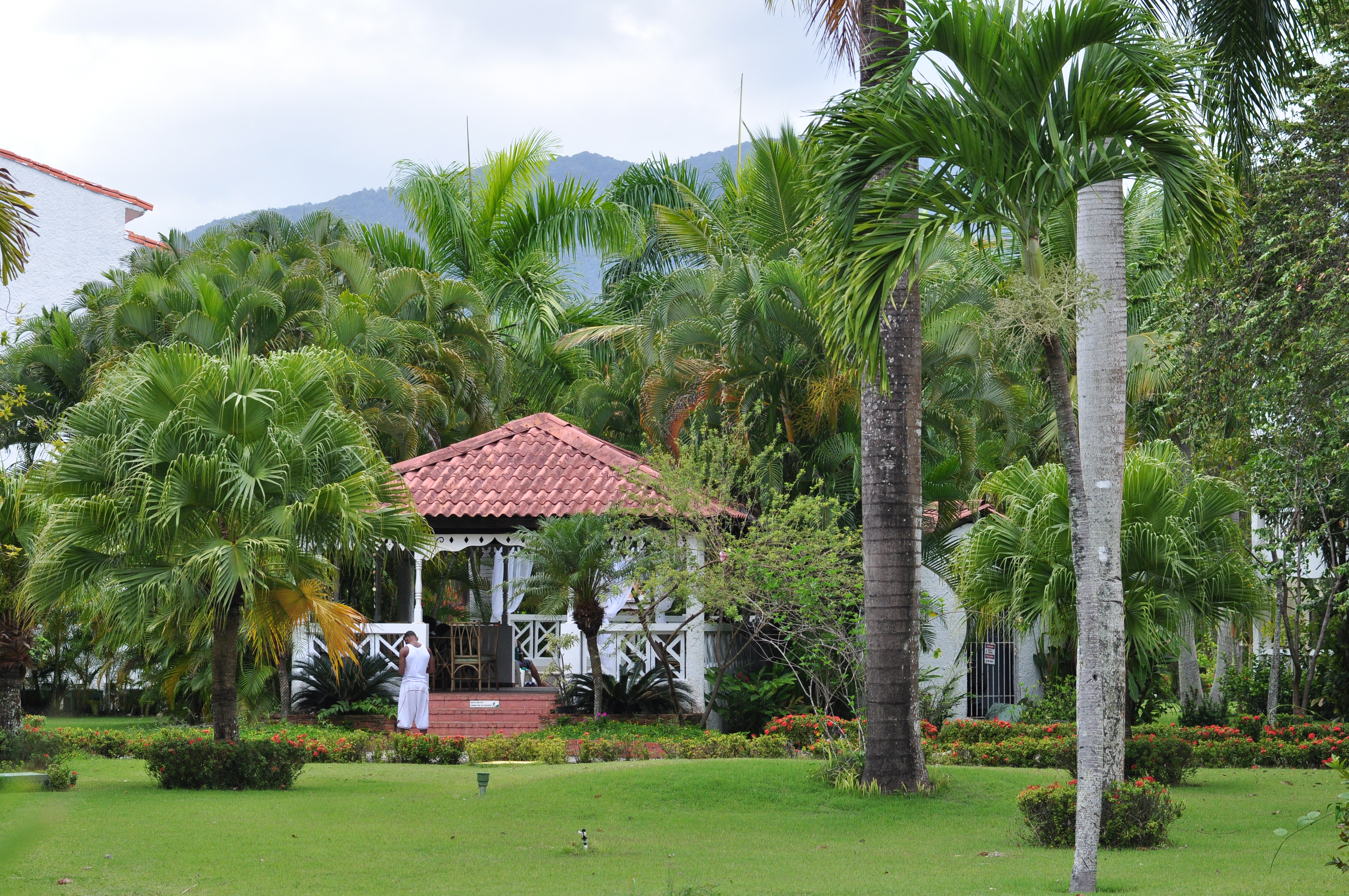
Puerto Plata resort area.

The city's tourist centers include Playa Dorada and Costa Dorada, located to the east of San Felipe of Puerto Plata. There are a total of 100,000 hotel beds in the city; there are a number of "all-inclusive" resort hotels.

Beyond the coastal resorts, the surrounding Puerto Plata area also includes forested mountain terrain used for hiking and other outdoor activities.

Puerto Plata is served by Gregorio Luperón International Airport, situated around 15 kilometers (9.3 mi) to the east of the city, near the town La Union.

In 2015, Carnival Cruise Line opened an $85 million cruise port called Amber Cove.

=== Fort ===
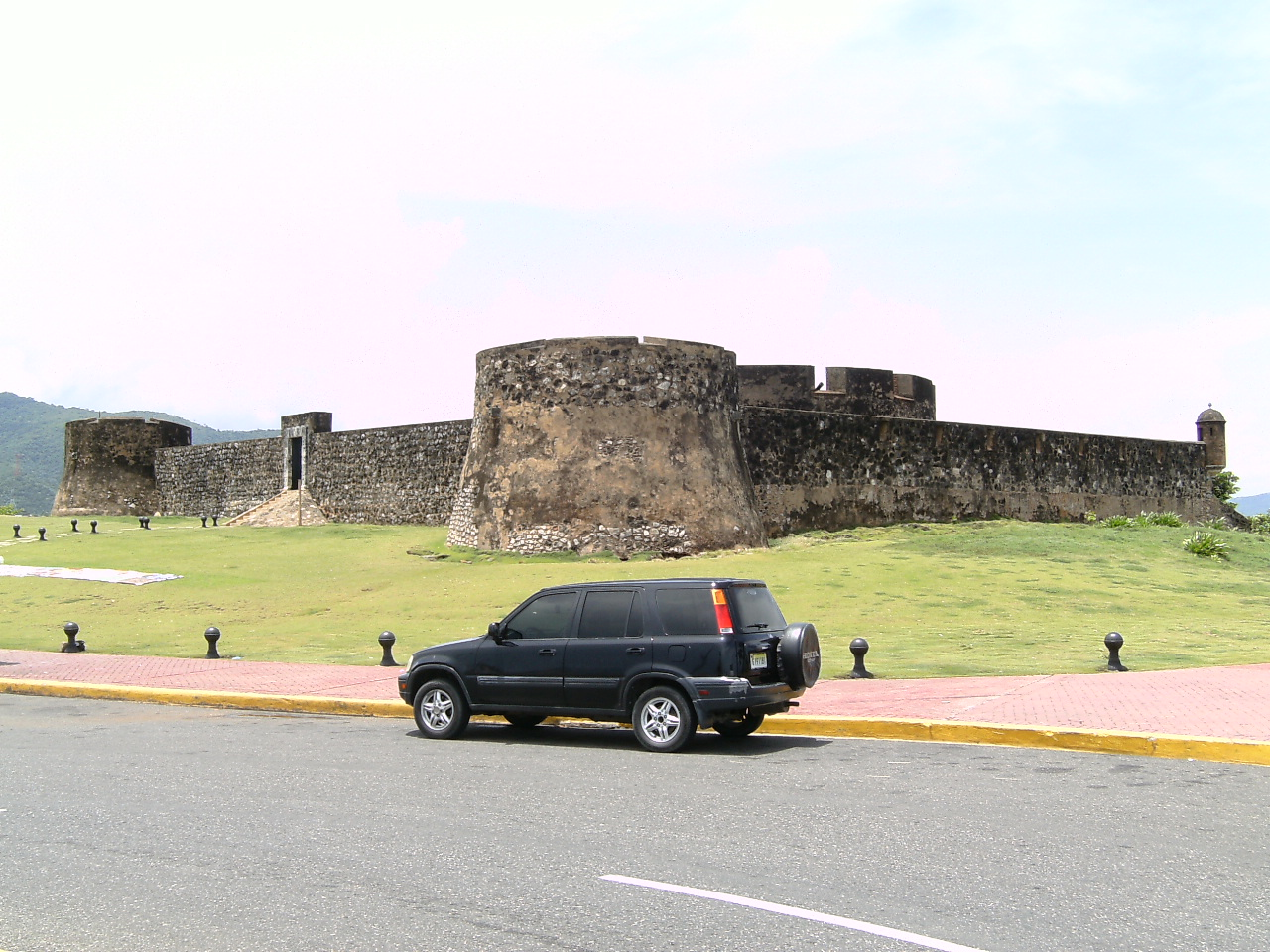
The fort of San Felipe

The fort is the main colonial monument of the city of Puerto Plata, since around it the city developed most of its history. In 1540, Álvaro Caballero went to the Court to request that a fortress be constructed in Puerto Plata. In 1549 the Archbishop and governing Fuenmayor was entrusted with its construction, but it was still not done even in 1560, when the Audiencia Real ordered it commence under the charge of the French-born judge Juan Echagoín to initiate its work. This work was finished in 1577. The purpose was to protect the city against the incursions of bandits, the corsairs and French and English pirates who continuously terrified inhabitants of Puerto Plata. Its name is in honor of Felipe II, in whose reign its construction was finished. In 1980 it was declared a national monument.

=== Ocean World ===
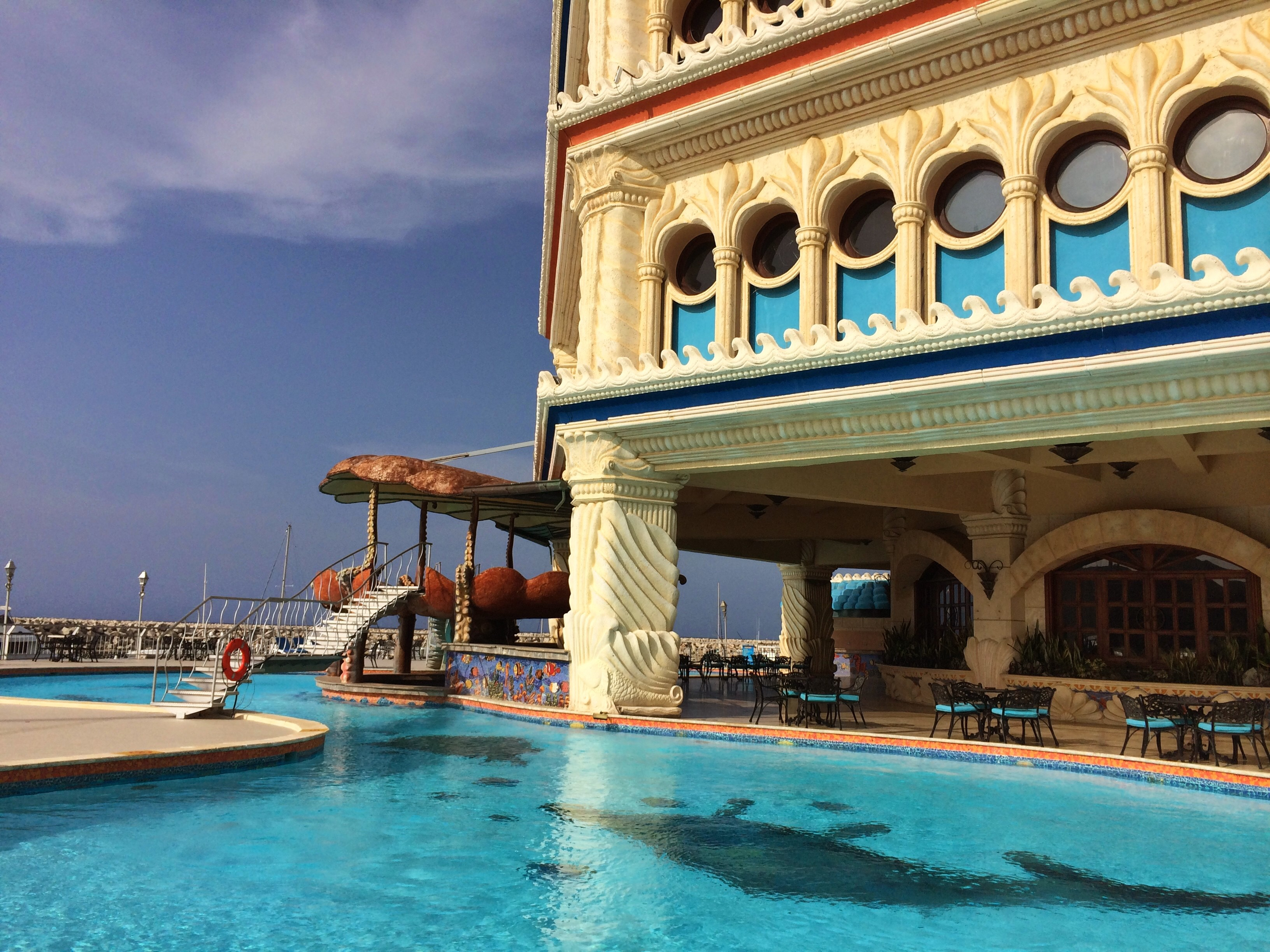
Ocean World Cofresi – Puerto Plata

Ocean World is an adventure park located amidst the reefs of the Beach of Cofresí.

Ocean World is located within a tourist complex on the north coast of the Dominican Republic.

=== Museums ===
Museo del Ámbar: The business Costa, Inc., a cultural company of family administration, directed by Aldo Costa, founded the Museo del Ámbar Dominicano in 1982 in the Villa Bentz, (more elegant Hotel of Puerto Plata of the year 1918, built by the Spanish architect Marín Gallart and Cantú). This museum is considered the first Museum of Amber of the Dominican Republic and at the same time, is a great historic monument of the city.

La Zona Colonial (Casas Victorianas): From 1857, it was initiated in Puerto Plata. The Victorian style originating from England, call thus, in honor of the Queen Victoria, manager of that epoch. This it extended to almost everyone and was considered it more modern.

The fundamental characteristics were the elaboration of the wood in artistic form, for the construction of dwellings. From that moment, Puerto Plata defined clearly their architectural style, evolving to what we have nowadays as our patrimony. The rise and development of that new modality in the art of construction, was what gave start, to the buildings of the Victorian houses of the decade from the 70 of the 19th century. Creating a unique style in the city, which him is known today as Victorian architecture of Puerto Plata.

=== El Faro ===
The cast-iron lighthouse was built in 1879, under the interim regime of Gregorio Luperón. It consists of a tower elevated on a masonry base, on Doric columns, and rising to 137 feet (42 m) above sea level. Due to its position on the coast the cast iron suffered from corrosion and for its poor condition it was included in the 2000 World Monuments Watch by the World Monuments Fund. American Express provided funds for a restoration project, which was completed in 2004. After the restoration, the Dominican Republic's Dirección Nacional de Patrimonio Monumental announced that the historic district around the lighthouse would also be revitalized.

=== Teleférico ===
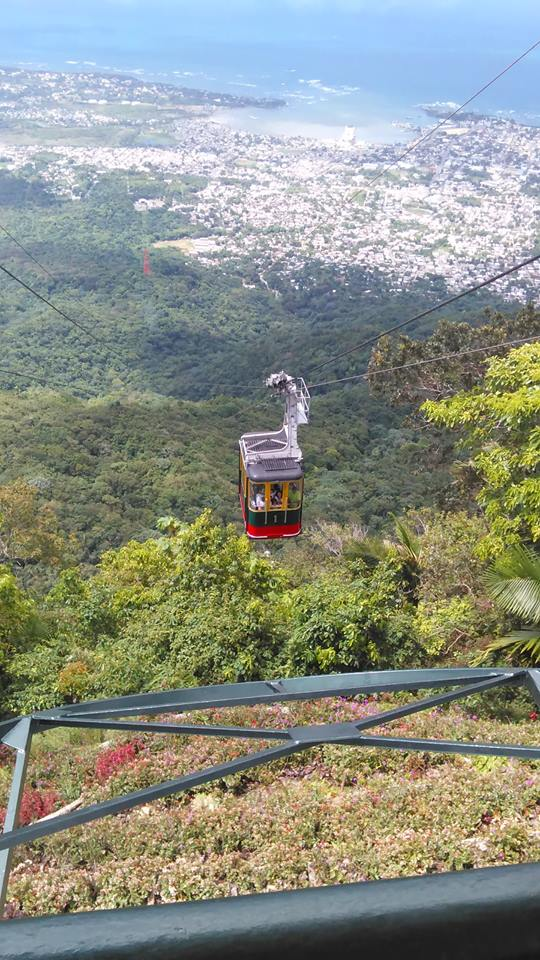

The Teleférico cable car was inaugurated in 1975, with construction of Italian origin. It can carry 17 people and takes eight minutes to climb and descend the mountain. It is moved by an electric hydraulic system, conducted by a central operator, situated in the base station. This small train has protective glass walls, and offers the visitor a panoramic view of the city descending from the hill (which at its top is 2,555 feet (779 m) above sea level). Visitors can see the local landscape, including a garden of 215 features and the flora of the country, gift shops and a restaurant with Dominican food. It is managed by a patronage, which maintains it under the principles of conservation.

=== Beaches ===
The beaches contain golden sands with a mountainous natural landscape. They contain uveros, almonds, yawls, rowboats, music, and dances. The beaches include: La Poza del Castillo, Cofresí, Costámbar, Long Beach, Marapicá, Playa Dorada, Maimón, and Bergantín. The beaches are considered one of the main tourist attractions of the city.

=== Mountain Pico Isabel de Torres ===
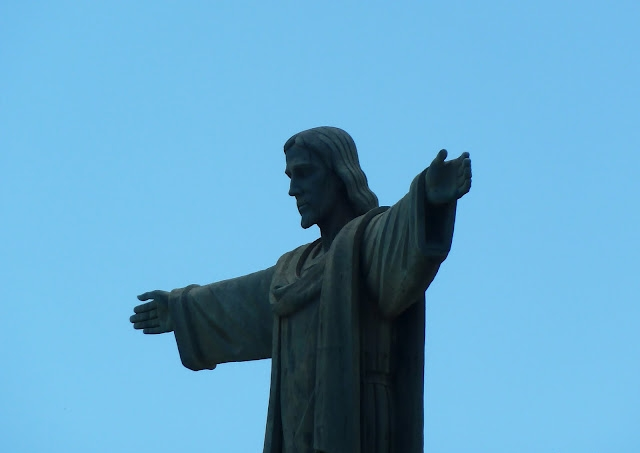
Christ the Redeemer statue – Puerto Plata

On the 739 m (2,425 ft)-high mountain Pico Isabel de Torres, the highest point of Puerto Plata, there is a botanical garden and a replica of Christ the Redeemer, the famous statue in Rio de Janeiro; though the statue is of a smaller size, the mountain itself is taller than that of Rio. The roads leading up the mountain are subject to large amounts of rain and are occasionally impassable.

== Transportation ==
Puerto Plata is served by Gregorio Luperón International Airport which has service by 13 passenger and 3 cargo airlines. Port of Puerto Plata is the main commercial port on the north coast of the Dominican Republic.

== Notable residents ==
- Ulises Heureaux y Antonio Imbert – former president of the Dominican Republic
- Al Horford – current NBA player
- Chris Duarte – current NBA player
- Vojislav Stanimirović Journalist owns a villa overlooking the Puerto Plata Bay since 1990's.
- Tito Horford – former NBA player and father of Al Horford
- Arthur Lithgow, American-Dominican actor and director; born in Puerto Plata in 1915
- Gregorio Luperón – former president of the Dominican Republic
- Carlos Martínez, former MLB player
- Carlos Felipe Morales – former president of the Dominican Republic
- Emilio Prud'Homme – writer of the "National Anthem of the Dominican Republic"
- José Fermín, current MLB player
- Oscar Taveras – MLB player, 2014 (d. 2014)
- Tokischa – rapper (b.1997)
