= James Sterrett =

American military officer (c. 1764–1825)

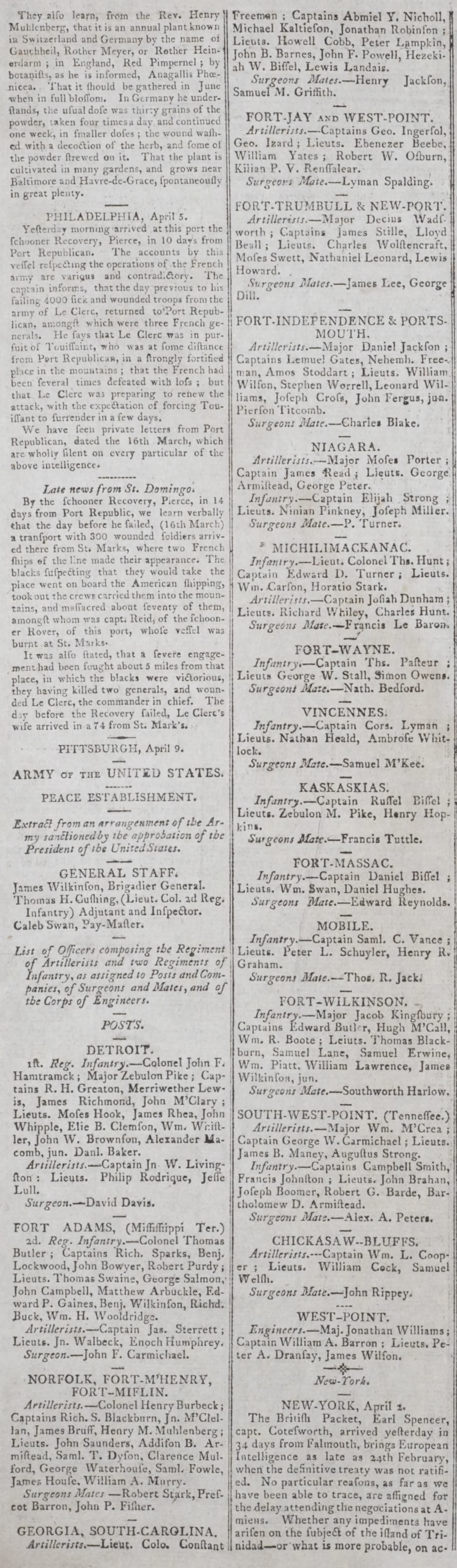
- "Army of the United States – Peace Establishment" April 9, 1802
- Born: 1763–1765; Cumberland County, Province of Pennsylvania
- Died: May 27, 1825

James Sterrett (c. 1764 – May 27, 1825) was a career army officer in the early republic period of the United States. Born in central Pennsylvania, and originally an artillerist, he served under Anthony Wayne and was involved in the Northwest Indian War in the Northwest Territory. He participated in the transfer of the Natchez District and Louisiana to the United States. He resigned his commission and went into business around 1805. He was a familiar of major American figures of the territorial period in the Mississippi River Valley, for instance general James Wilkinson. He was thus tangentially involved in the long-running "no, you're a treasonous rascal" disputes resulting the collapse of the Daniel Clark–James Wilkinson business partnership, the court martial of Thomas Butler, the Burr conspiracy, and the allegations that Wilkinson was an agent of the Spanish government. Sterrett worked for a time as an editor of the Louisiana Gazette newspaper, and as a cotton factor. He was briefly partners with Henry Clay's brother John Clay in a commission merchant firm called Clay & Sterrett. At approximately age 50, Sterrett may have volunteered to participate in the defense of New Orleans during the War of 1812, as there is an account of him being injured during the battle of January 8. He was appointed to be an external revenue officer at the New Orleans Customs House in 1820 and worked there, selling fire insurance on the side, until his death in 1825.

== Career ==
James Sterrett was born "in the neighborhood" of Carlisle, Cumberland County, British colonial Pennsylvania between 1763 and 1765. Nothing is known for certain about his family background but another James Sterrett was one of a group of Irish immigrant Presbyterians who established businesses in Carlisle and later in colonial Baltimore.

Sterrett reportedly joined the United States Army "soon after St. Clair's defeat," meaning after November 1791. He "marched to the west, then an unforted wilderness, and joined the army of that gallant soldier, General Wayne." He was described as a participant in "the most difficult struggles in opposing and subduing the merciless savages of the west."

Sterrett was commissioned a lieutenant of artillerists and engineers in the U.S. Army in June 1794. In March 1799 he was promoted to captain in an artillery regiment. He appeared on "Arrangement of the Companies in the 1st. Battalion of Artillery, annexed to the Western Army, under the Command of Major Rivardi, 1st October 1799" as a lieutenant based in Mississippi. In 1802 he was stationed at Fort Adams (under command of Thomas Butler, also of Pennsylvania). He was involved in a plan to develop a town at Bruinsburg, Mississippi. Sterrett was paymaster of the U.S. Army in March 1804 when a detachment of U.S. Marines landed at New Orleans. Sterrett was arrested on unknown charges in early 1804.

He was listed an army captain stationed at Natchitoches, Louisiana in 1805. He resigned his commission in September 1805 and settled in New Orleans. Sterrett was one of several officers who resigned from the Army in 1805 in part because they had some kind of conflict with Wilkinson. In 1808 he wrote to a friend about a "balance to the United States which I Must pay next winter."

According to historian Jared William Bradley, in 1809, three months after arriving in New Orleans, Daniel Carmick, commander of a group of American marines (and eventually a stepson-in-law of Sterrett) "was pulled into the swirl of actions generated by General James Wilkinson in his efforts to defend himself against charges that he was a paid espionage agent for the Spanish and, as such, had played a leading role in the Burr conspiracy. In response to the demand of his superior, General Wilkinson, Carmick provided a deposition on September 25, 1809, that was damaging to both Daniel Clark and James Sterrett." According to Bradley, Carmick may have been coerced by some means to make this statement, and "Wilkinson's wrath in this instance was directed more at Sterrett than Clark. Wilkinson described Sterrett as 'notoriously hostile to the government' and 'a miserable dependent' of Clark. There is no truth to the first part of this statement, and the latter part is true only to the extent that Sterrett, like many businessmen in New Orleans at this time, was suffering from the loss of business as a result of the embargo adopted by the Jefferson administration and needed work to provide for his family."

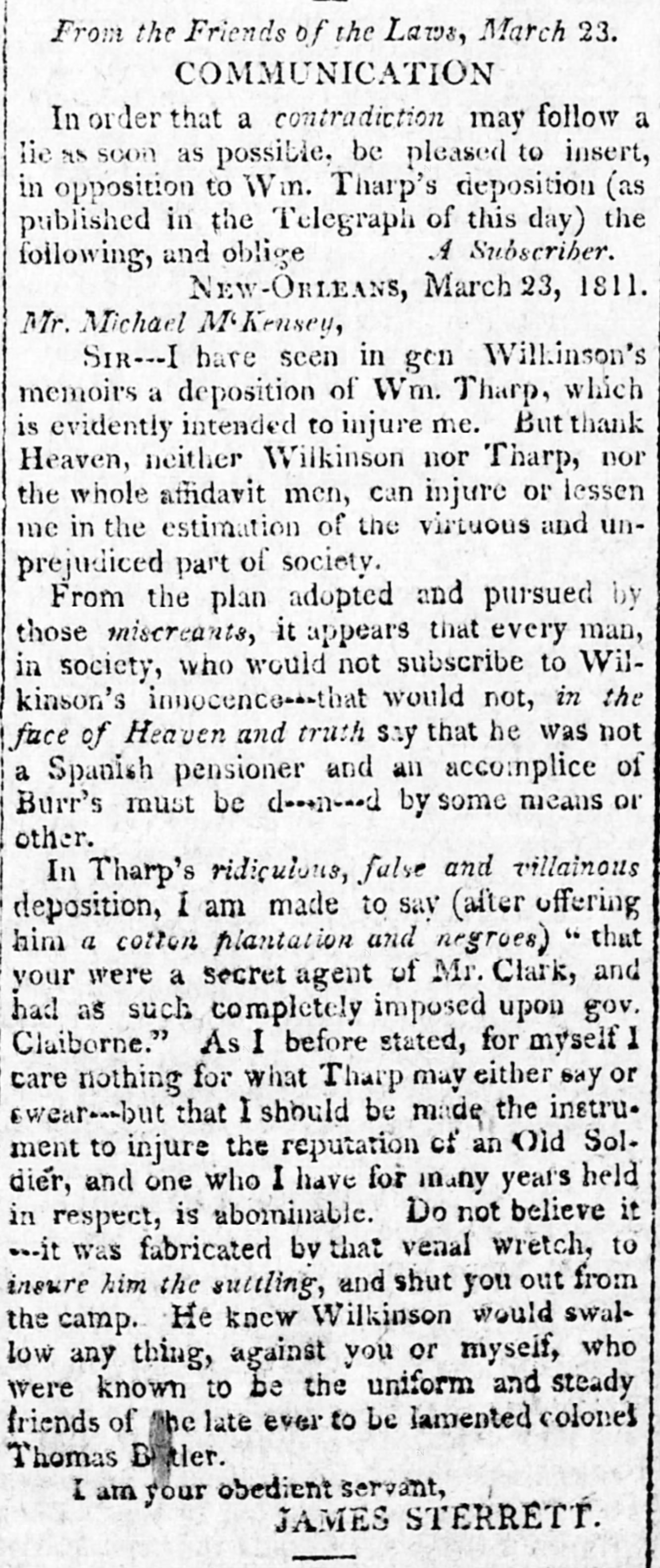
Alexandria Gazette, May 23, 1811

During the period of 1809–1810, Sterrett was also abandoned by his business partner, John Clay, brother of Henry Clay. John Clay had married Julie Duralde, daughter of Martin Duralde of Attapakas, in 1807. Another Duralde sister had been governor W. C. C. Claiborne's second wife. Clay & Sterrett had run a commission merchant business but Clay "returned to Kentucky, leaving the debts owed by their partnership, Clay & Sterrett." To support his family and pay debts, Sterrett worked at the Louisiana Gazette newspaper as an editor. He also had a "counting room" at 16 Bienville Street where he worked as a cotton factor. In 1810 he lived on Rampart Street in New Orleans. He published a public letter in 1811 stating that around 1800 or 1801 General Wilkinson had embezzled public money to buy slaves from a Mr. Jones in Maryland; the slaves were bought on credit by John Ellis, Richard Butler, and others, while "the notes" were held by Abijah Hunt.

Sometime after 1811, Sterrett married Eliza O'Brien Cowperthwaite, widow of Jacob Cowperthwaite. She was a native of North Carolina. They had a son together. They also had a daughter, Margaret Sterrett. Eliza's daughters from her first marriage married Michael Reynolds Jr., Marine Corps commander Daniel Carmick, and George Thompson Ross, whose sister Catherine was married to Richard Claiborne, a cousin of governor Claiborne, and who at the Battle of New Orleans "commanded the right side of the nineteen-hundred-yard 'Line Jackson' which extended from the Mississippi River along the Rodriguez Canal into the swamp south of the Gentilly Plain." On December 2, 1814, Sterrett wrote Andrew Jackson offering to organize and command an artillery battalion. Sterrett seemingly did participate in the Battle of New Orleans, as the Natchez Gazette printed a letter reporting that "Capt. James Sterrett of New —" was among the wounded.

In 1816 Sterrett owed taxes on 800 acres in Adams County, Mississippi Territory. In 1818 a judgement in Clarks administrators & James Sterrett vs. F. L. Claiborne heirs forced the auction of the late Ferdinand L. Claiborne's DeWitt plantation. In 1825 he was listed as a candidate to be alderman of the first ward of New Orleans. When he died in 1825, he was employed at the U.S. Customs House in New Orleans, where he had been working as an "external revenue" officer since 1820. His widow died in New Orleans in 1835, and is entombed at St. Louis No. 2.

== Legacy ==
The Louisiana State University Library special collections department holds letters written by James Sterret to his friends Nathaniel Evans and Fulwar Skipwith. Topics in the letters to Evans include "personal and financial situations, New Orleans social life, enmity with Creoles, politics, yellow fever, Aaron Burr conspiracy, and the trials of Aaron Burr and General Thomas Butler." Topics in the letters to Skipwith include "national and Louisiana politics and the War of 1812." Sterrett is a source on the migration of people from Saint-Domingue to Louisiana by way of Havana following the Haitian Revolution.

Note: This Captain Sterrett should not be confused with the Captain Andrew Sterett who commanded the USS Enterprise (1799) against the Barbary pirates.

== Sources ==
- Boudreaux, Sybil Ann (May 1983). The First Minute Book of the Supreme Court of the State of Louisiana 1813 to May, 1818: An Annotated Edition (M.A. History). University of New Orleans. 1683.
- Bradley, James W., ed. (2002). Interim Appointment: W.C.C. Claiborne Letter Book, 1804–1805. The Louisiana Purchase Collection. LSU Press. ISBN 978-0-8071-2684-4. LCCN 2001004234. OCLC 47746051.
- Hamersly, Thomas Holdup Stevens (1881). Complete regular army register of the United States for one hundred years (1779 to 1879). Washington, D.C.: T.H.S. Hamersly – via Internet Archive, University of Pittsburgh Library System.
