= Amber Cove =

Cruise terminal in the Dominican Republic

Amber Cove Cruise Center
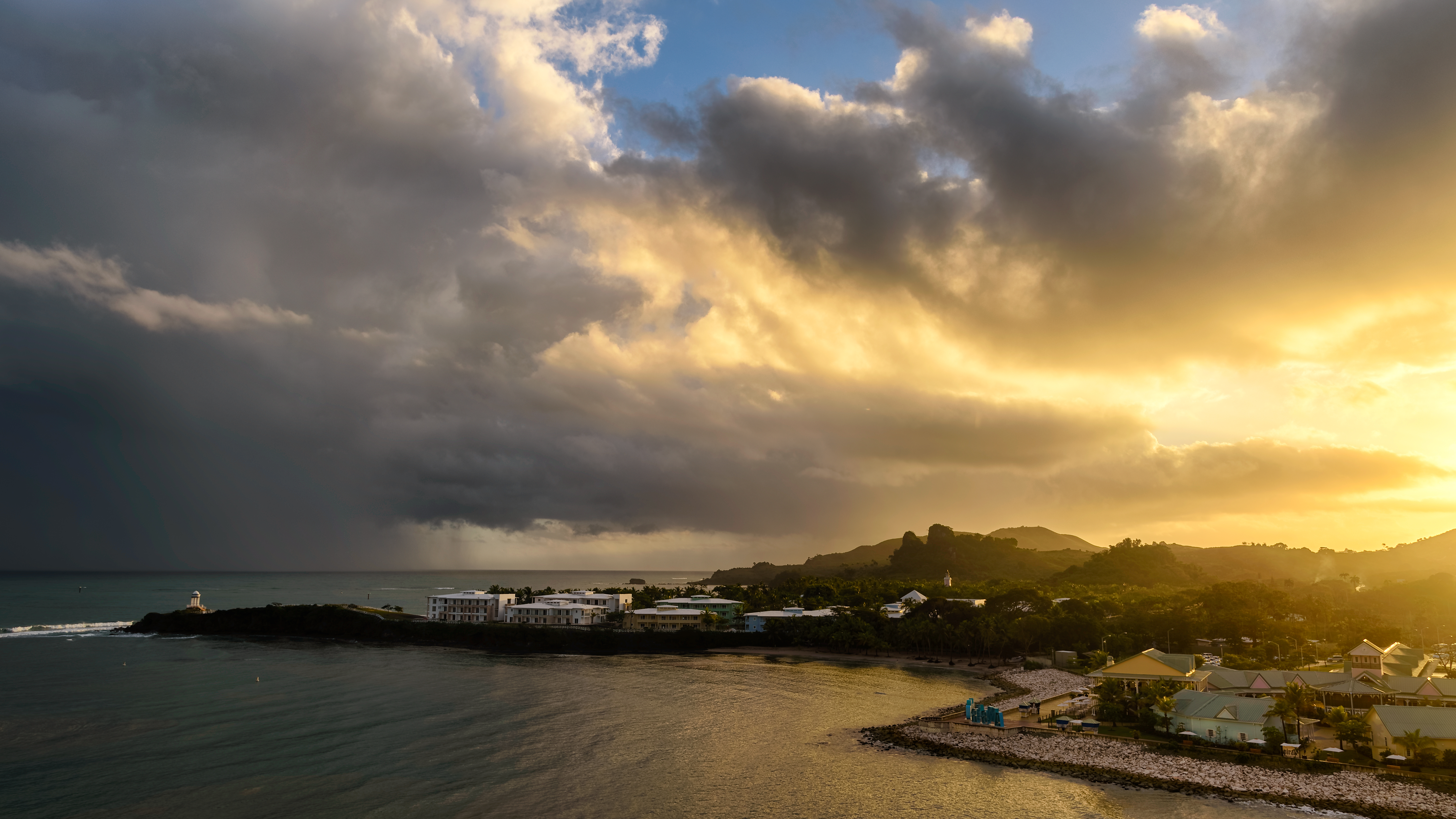
- Interactive map of Amber Cove Cruise Center

Location
- Country: Dominican Republic
- Location: Maimón, Puerto Plata, 57000
- Coordinates: 19.8326°N 70.7739°W

Statistics
- Website www.ambercove.com

Amber Cove is a cruise terminal in Maimón, Puerto Plata, Dominican Republic.

The terminal includes lodging and retail stores.

Carnival Cruise Line held a groundbreaking ceremony to mark the start of construction in May 2012.
