= Fortaleza San Felipe =

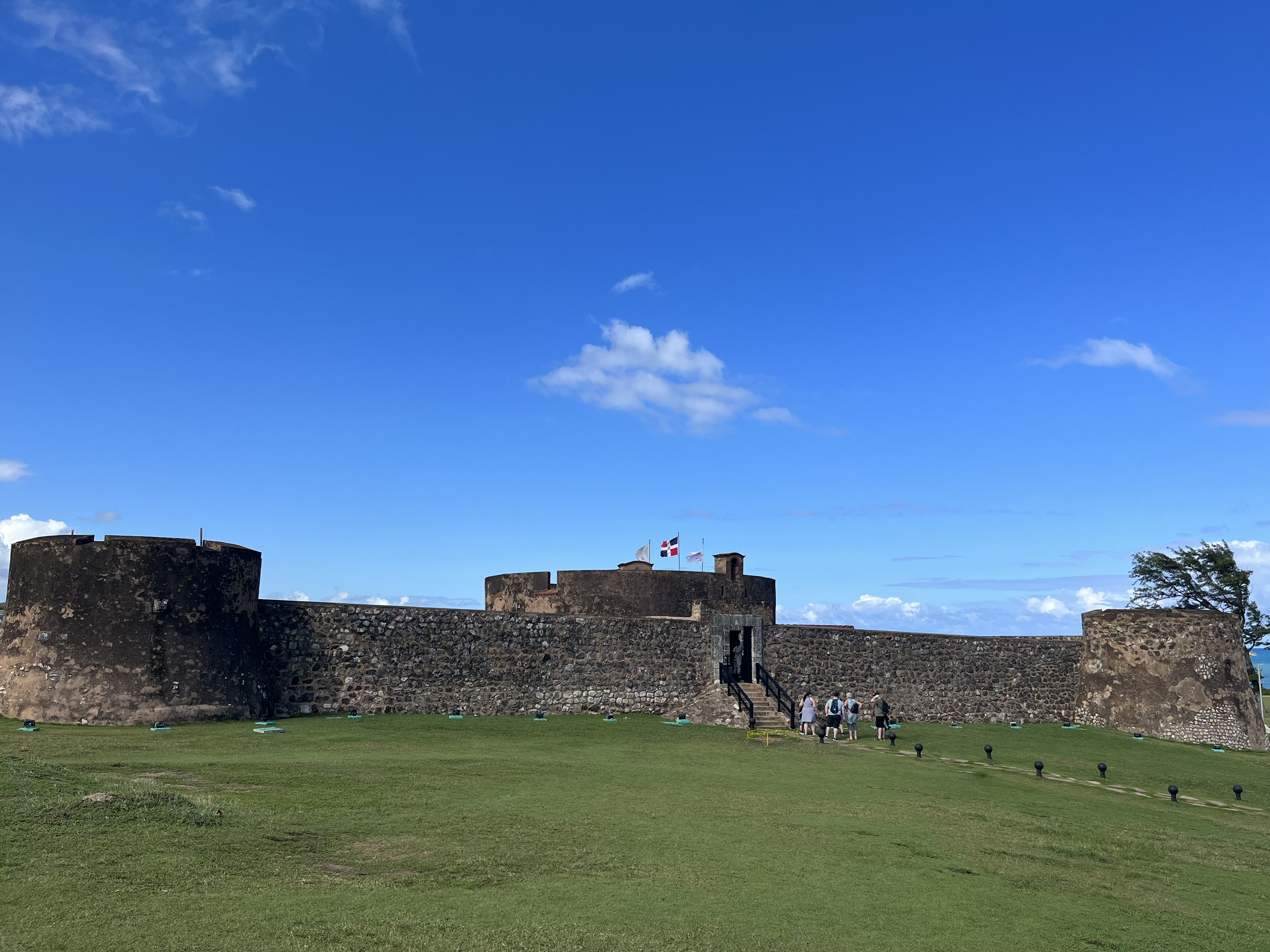
- Fortaleza San Felipe, 2024
- Established: 1965; Opened to the Public in 1983
- Location: Puerto Plata, Dominican Republic
- Coordinates: 19.8041°N 70.695925°W
- Type: History museum

The Fortaleza San Felipe is a historic Spanish fort located in the north of the Dominican Republic in the province of Puerto Plata. Also known as El Morro de San Felipe, it was used to protect the City of Puerto Plata from foreign invaders, pirates, and privateers. It is located on a hill at the Puntilla del Malecón (the "seawall point"), overlooking the entrance to the city's seaport.

The fort's construction was commissioned in 1564 and completed in 1577. It was named for King Felipe II of Spain. It was abandoned from 1605 to 1736 as a result of the Devastations of Osorio. The fort is one of the oldest European structures in the Caribbean, and is the only remnant of the 16th century in Puerto Plata.

Today, the Fortaleza San Felipe serves as a museum showcasing the important role it has played in the history of Puerto Plata and the Dominican Republic. The fort houses military artifacts from the 18th and 19th centuries.

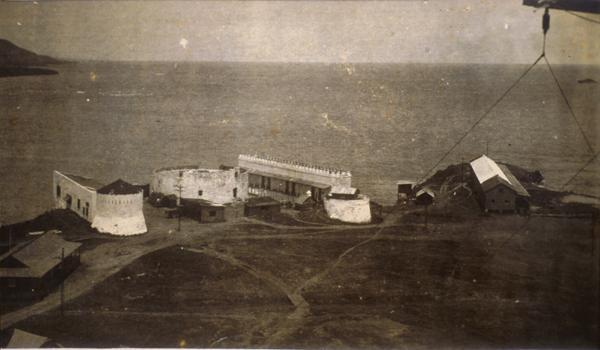
Fortaleza San Felipe (c. 1920) before its restoration in 1972

== History ==
In 1564 the Spanish commissioned the construction of a fort in Puerto Plata, under the direction of Francisco Ceballos. After Ceballos' death in 1572, construction was taken over by Don Rengifo de Angulo. The fort's construction was completed in 1577. It was named for the King of Spain, Felipe II.

The fort was strategically constructed on a hill overlooking the Atlantic Ocean and entrance to the city's harbor: the Port of Puerto Plata. The fort's purpose was to defend the island's north coast from attacks from rival European powers and pirates.

Over the centuries, the fort was the site of battles, captures, and occupations. In 1659, the fort was temporarily captured by buccaneers. In 1800, the fortress was the scene of one of the few land battles in the Quasi War, against the United States. Specifically, the Battle of Puerto Plata Harbor in May 1800 saw American forces overwhelm both the French and Spanish forces. In 1863, the Spanish took refuge in the Fortaleza de San Felipe when the city was attacked by Dominican patriots on August 27. The fort was captured and occupied by U.S. naval forces in 1916, at the start of the United States occupation of the Dominican Republic that lasted from 1916 to 1924.

The Fortaleza San Felipe was used as a prison multiple times throughout its history, including during the dictatorship of Rafael Trujillo. It was where President Pedro Santana jailed one of the Dominican Republic's founding fathers, Juan Pablo Duarte. During Trujillo's rule, it was where the husbands of the Mirabal sisters were jailed.

The fortress was converted into a museum in 1965. It underwent a major renovation in 1972, and was officially opened to public in 1983. Today, the fortress is the only remnant of the 16th century in Puerto Plata. Other historic areas were destroyed in battles or fires during the War of Restoration.

== Gallery ==
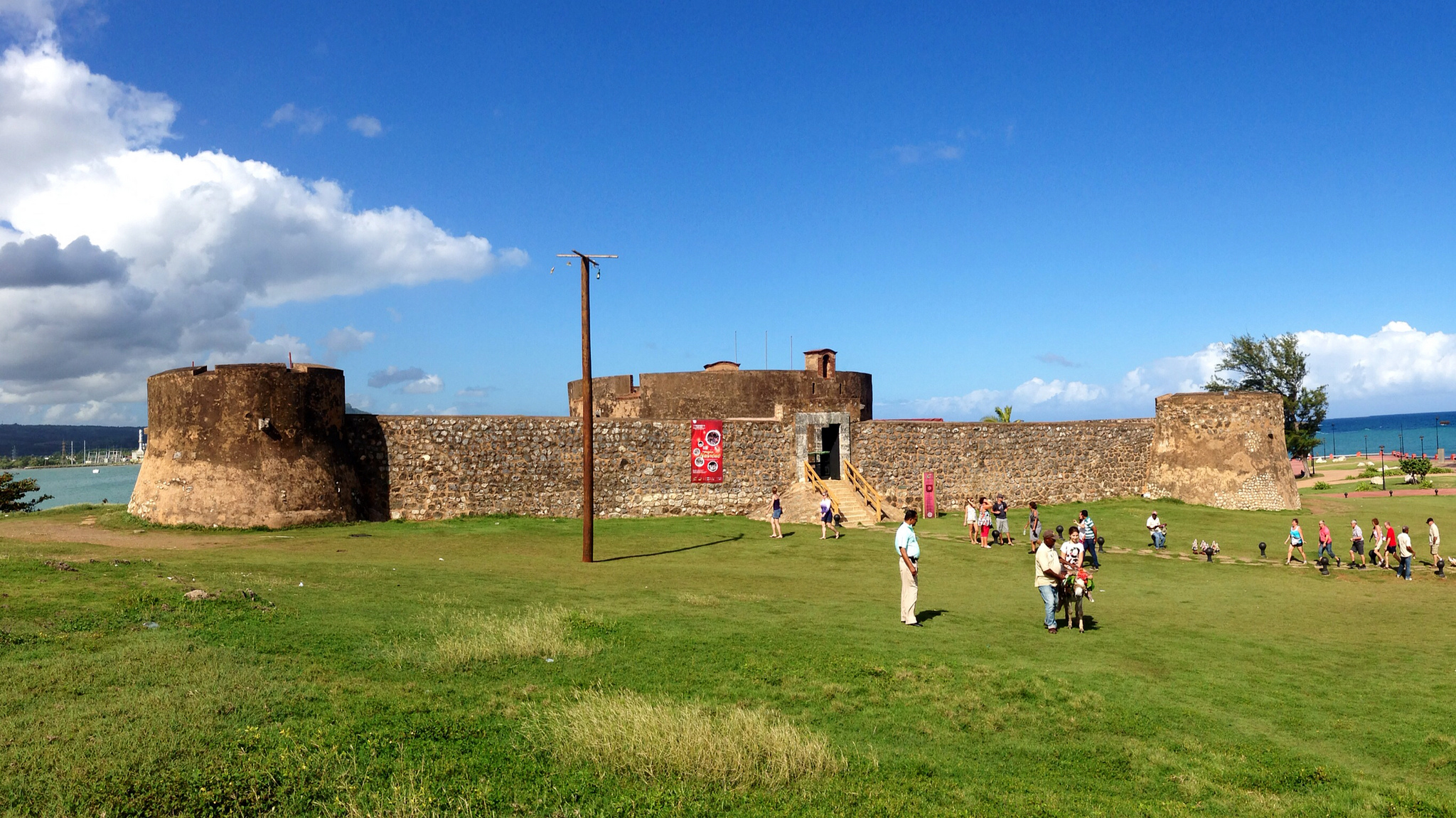
Visitors in front of the entrance to the fort

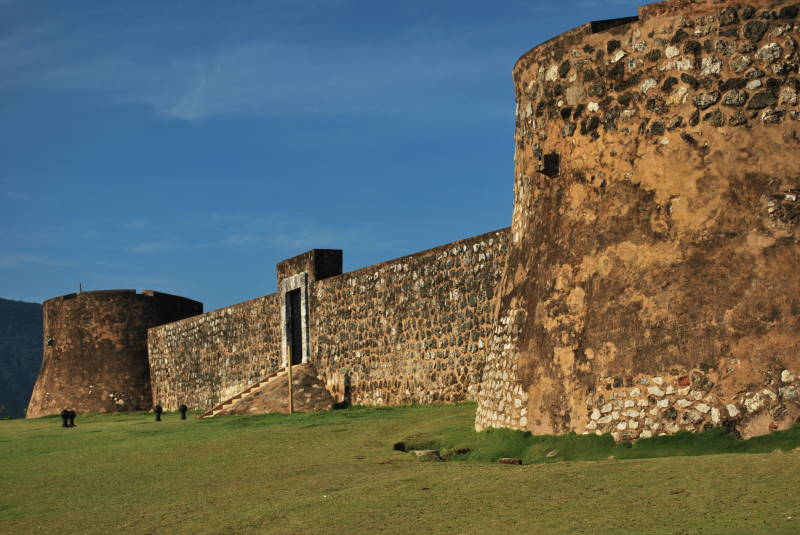
Fortress walls and entrance

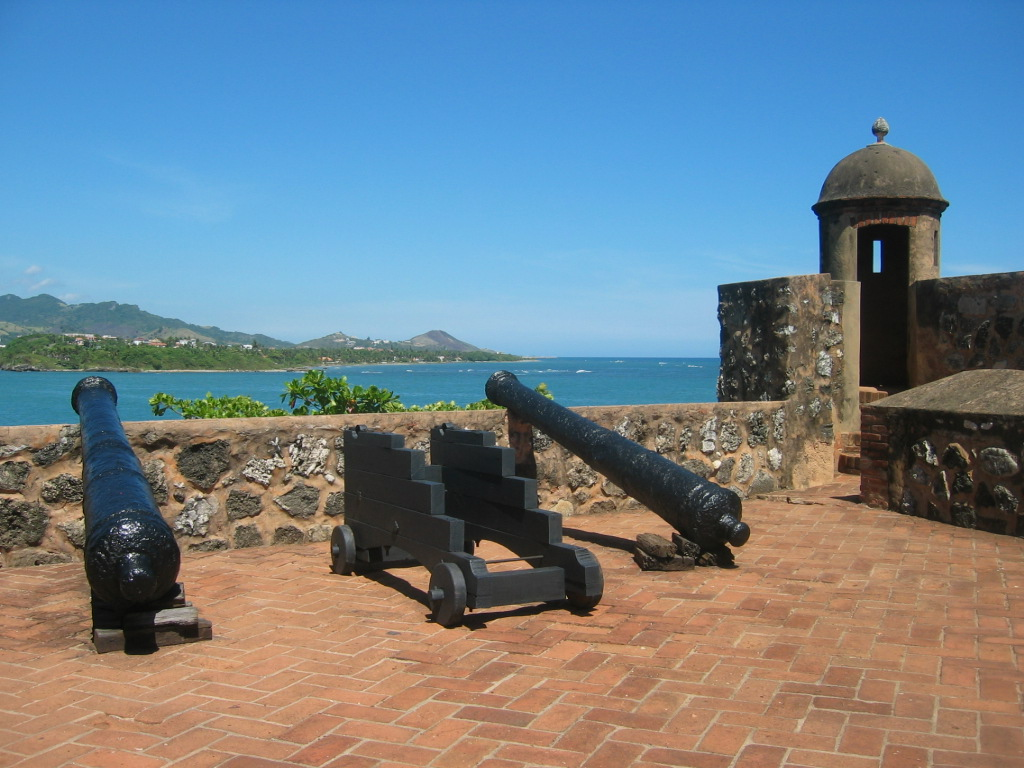
Cannons at fort

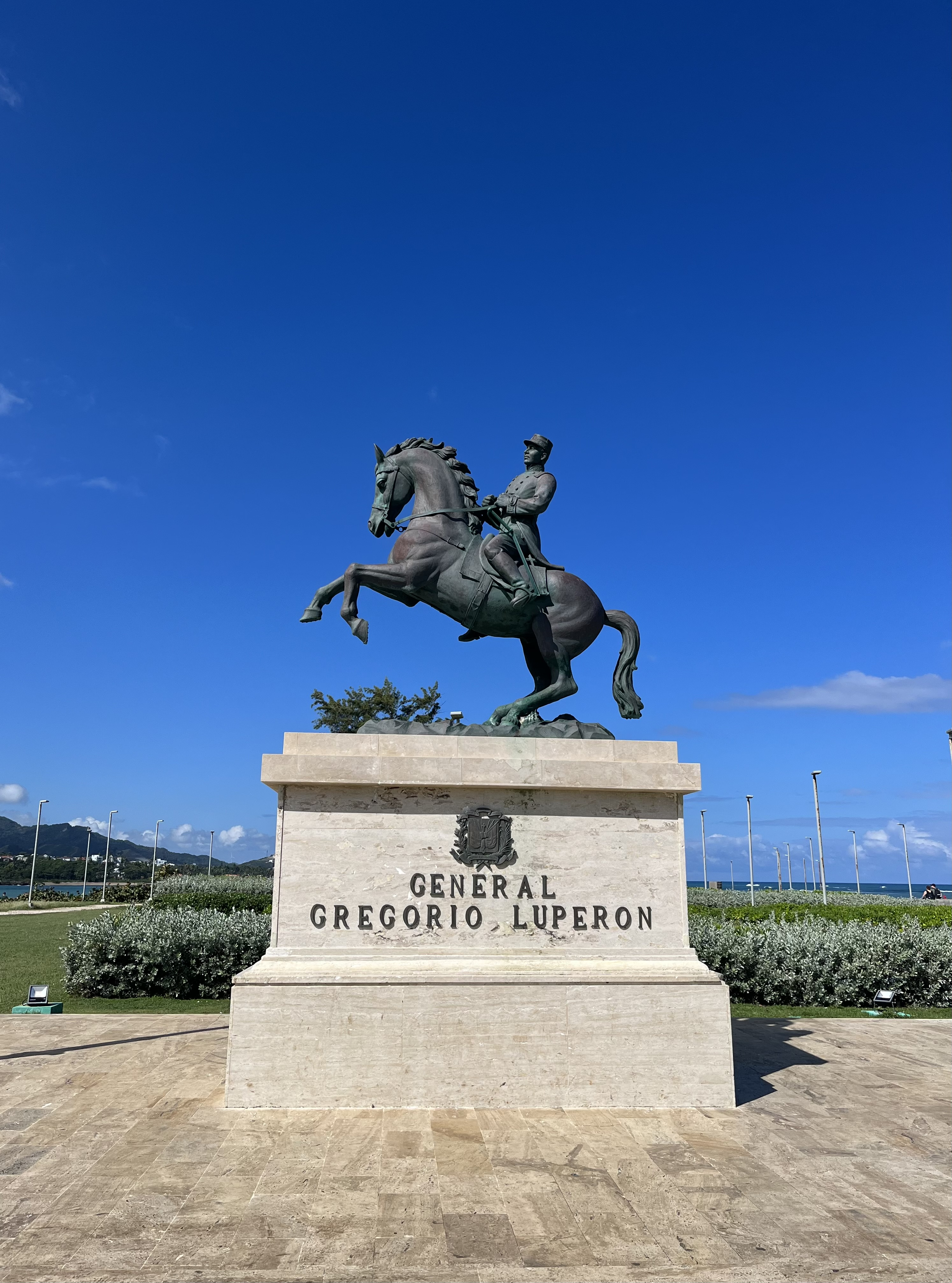
Statue of General Gregorio Luperón near the fort

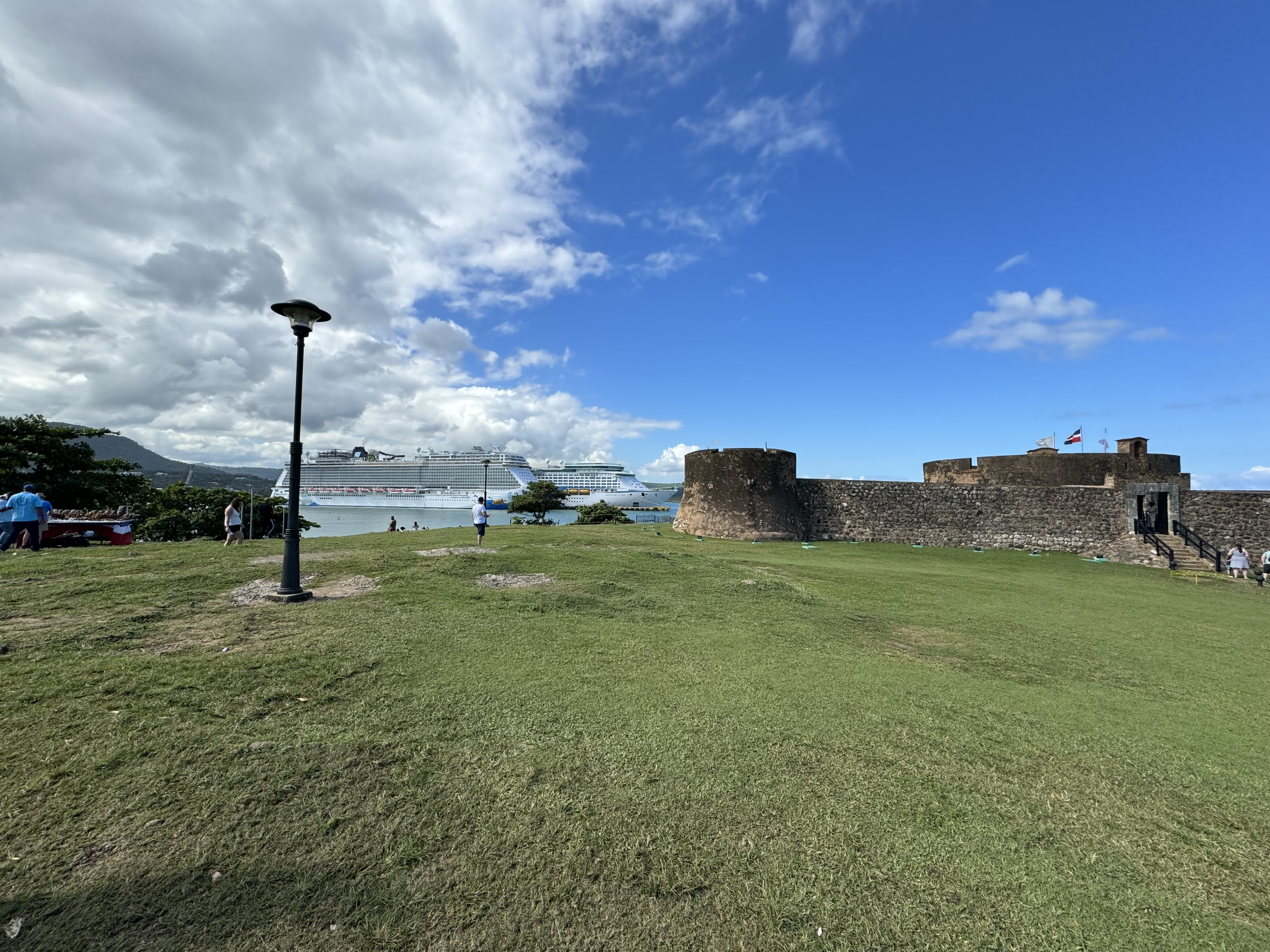
Fortress grounds, with cruise ship in the harbor in the background

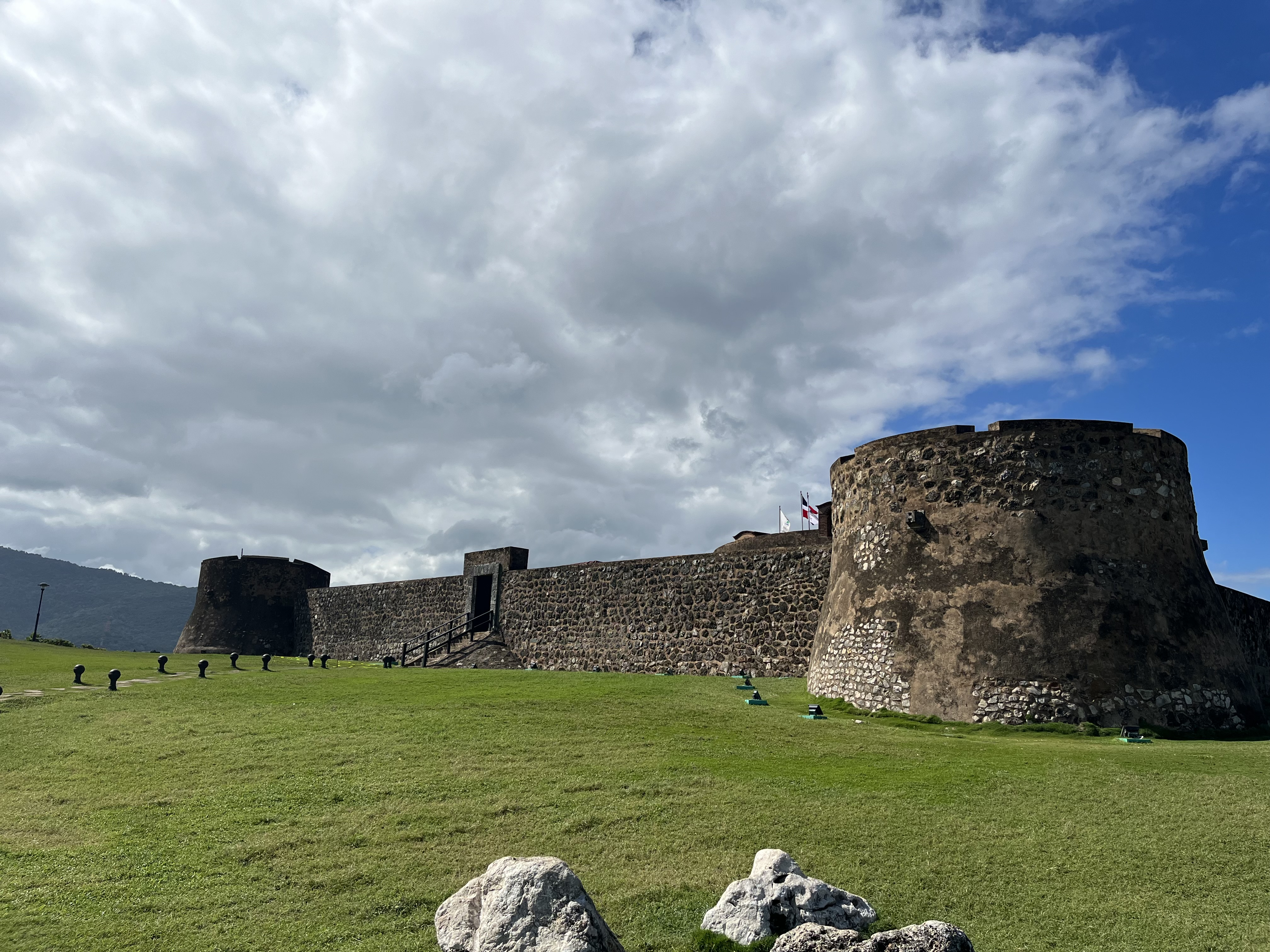
Entrance to the fort
