= Lists of ports =

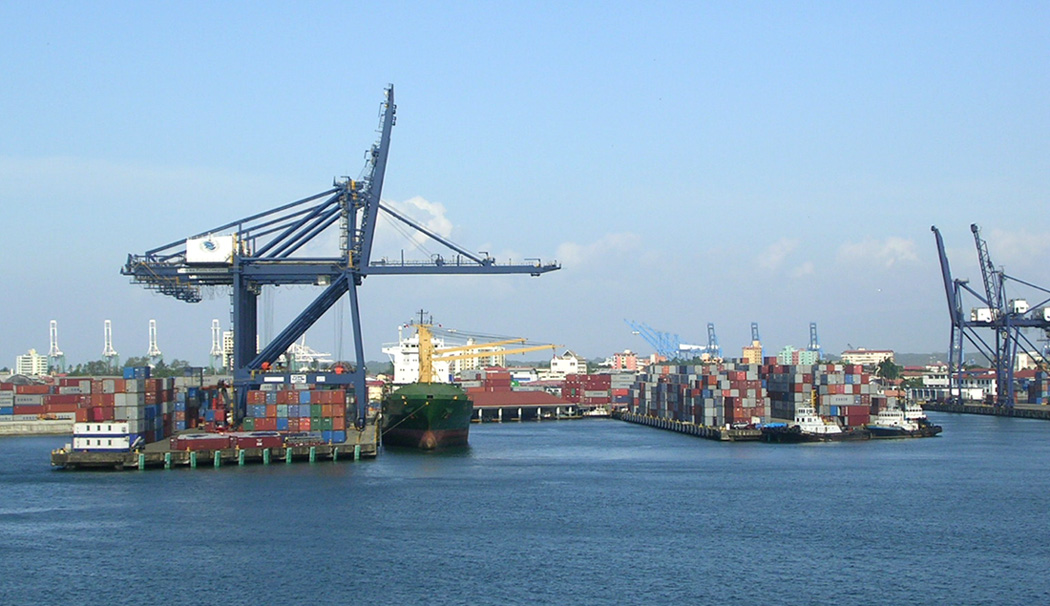
Colón, Panama

The following lists of ports cover ports of various types, maritime facilities with one or more wharves where ships may dock to load and discharge passengers and cargo. Most are on the sea coast or an estuary, but some are many miles inland, with access to the sea via river or canal. The lists are organized by shipping volume, by ocean or sea, by nation or sub-region, and by other characteristics.

== Lists of busiest ports ==
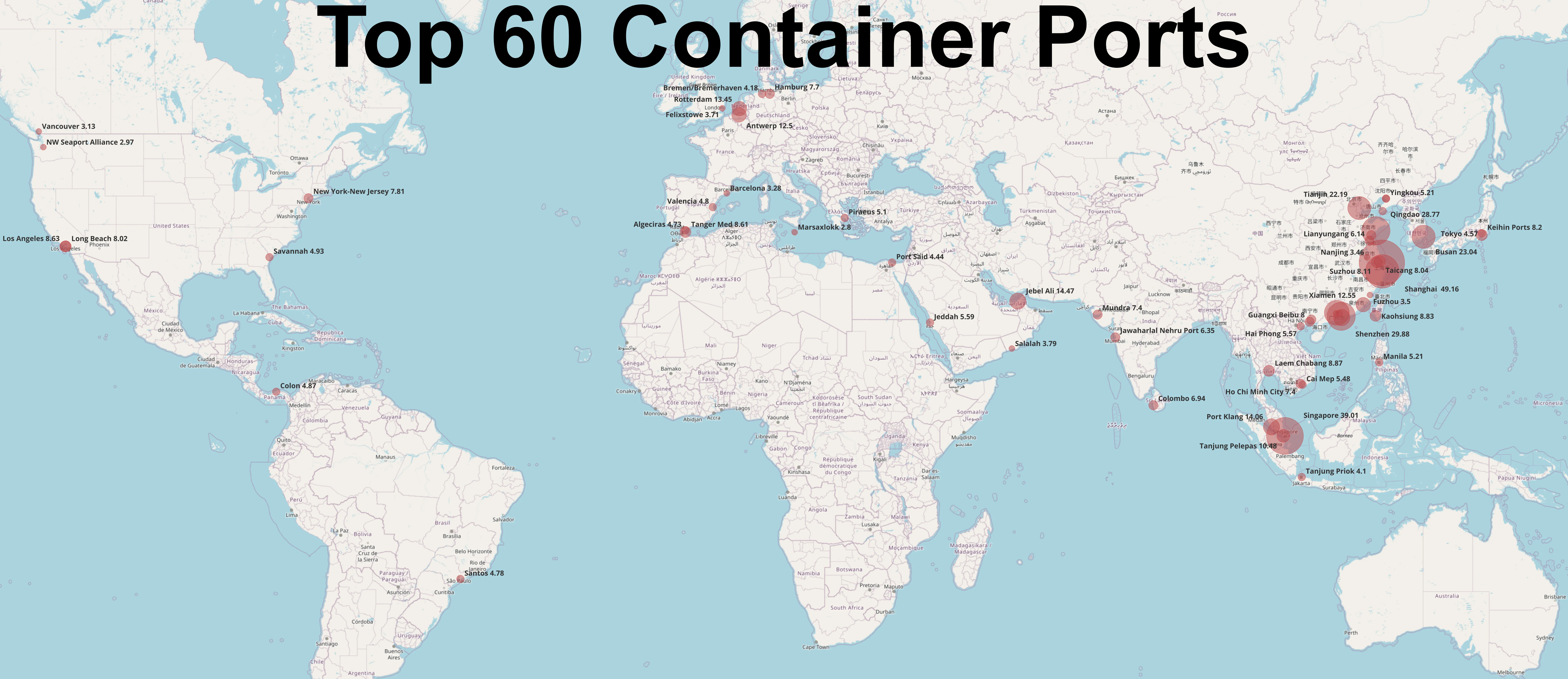
Top 60 container ports of 2023

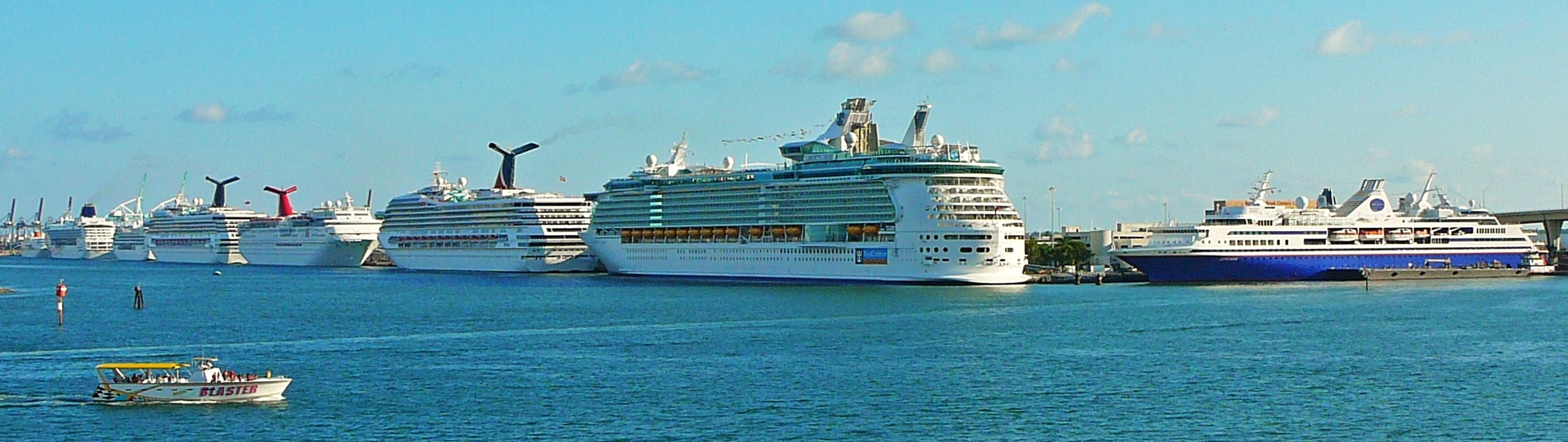
The Port of Miami is the world's busiest cruise port.

- List of busiest container ports – by number of twenty-foot equivalent units (TEUs) transported through the port
  - List of countries by container port traffic
- List of busiest ports by cargo tonnage – by weight of cargo transported through the port
- List of busiest ports in Europe – by several measures including number of twenty-foot equivalent units (TEUs) handled, by cargo tonnage and percentage transshipment
- List of busiest cruise ports by passengers

== Lists by ocean or sea ==
- List of ports and harbours of the Atlantic Ocean
  - Ports of the Baltic Sea
  - Channel Ports – ports and harbours of the English Channel
  - List of North Sea ports – ports of the North Sea and its influent rivers
  - List of coastal settlements of the Mediterranean Sea
- List of ports and harbors of the Arctic Ocean
- List of ports and harbours of the Indian Ocean
- List of ports and harbors of the Pacific Ocean
- Southern Ocean – See Category: Ports and harbors of Antarctica
  - Iceports
  - Ice pier – McMurdo Station

== National and sub-national lists ==
- List of ports in Albania
- List of ports in Argentina
- List of ports in Australia
- List of ports in Belgium
- List of ports in Bangladesh
- Transport in Cameroon
- List of ports in Cape Verde
- List of ports in China
  - List of ferries, wharfs and ports in Guangzhou
- List of ports in Denmark
- List of ports and harbours in Estonia
- List of ports in Finland
- List of ports in Greece
- List of ports in India
- List of ports in Indonesia
- Israel Port Authority
- List of ports in Ireland
- List of ports in Iraq
- Marsa Maroc
- List of seaports in Mexico
- Myanma Port Authority
- Nigerian Ports Authority
- List of ports in the Philippines
- List of ports in Portugal
- List of ports in Romania
- Ports and harbours in South Africa
- List of ports in Spain
  - List of seaports of the Valencian Community
- List of ports in Sri Lanka
- List of ports in Turkey
- List of ports in Ukraine
- Lists of ports in the United Kingdom
  - List of ports in Great Britain
  - List of ports and harbours in Northern Ireland
  - List of ports and harbours in Scotland
  - List of ports and harbours in Wales
- List of ports in the United States

== Dry ports ==
- Dry port (includes lists by continent)
- List of dry ports in Pakistan – inland inter-modal transshipment ports

== Other lists ==
- List of Chinese treaty ports
- List of free ports
- List of Panamax ports
- List of marinas
- List of ports and terminal infrastructure types

== See also ==
- List of ports (disambiguation)
- American Association of Port Authorities
- International Association of Ports and Harbors
- Port authority
- Intermodal freight transport
- Roll-on/roll-off car carrier
- Autorack
