= Ehrström =

Ehrström is a common Finnish surname. Notable people with the surname include:

- Carl Robert Ehrström (1803–1881), Finnish medical doctor, bacteriologist and archaeologist
- Erik Ehrström (1869–1947), Finnish lawyer and diplomat
- Freddy Ehrström (1925–2026), Finnish sailor

== See also ==
- Ehrenström, a North European surname
- Edström, a Swedish surname
