= List of ports in Great Britain =

This is a list of the seaports of Great Britain.

== Major operators ==
Five companies own many of the largest of UK ports: Associated British Ports (ABP), Forth Ports, Hutchison Port Holdings (HPH), Peel Group and PD Ports, and the largest independent trust ports are Aberdeen, Belfast, Blyth, Dover, London and Milford Haven.

All of these port operators are members of the British Ports Association, the national trade body for ports and harbours, and publish trade statistics for HM Revenue and Customs.

Some of these ports will be converted to Free-ports: special economic zones where customs rules such as taxes do not apply until goods leave the port.

== Major ports ==
Ports are listed clockwise from the Scottish border.

=== North-eastern England ===
- Berwick-upon-Tweed
- Warkworth
- Blyth
- Port of Tyne, South Shields
- Sunderland Docks, Sunderland
- Seaham
- Hartlepool
- Teesport, Middlesbrough
- Redcar
- Middlesbrough

=== Yorkshire and the Humber ===
- Whitby
- Scarborough
- Bridlington
- Port of Hull, Kingston upon Hull
- Port of Goole, Goole
- Grimsby
- Port of Immingham, Immingham

=== The Wash and East Anglia ===
- Boston
- Fosdyke
- Port of Wisbech, Wisbech
- Sutton Bridge
- King's Lynn
- Wells-next-the-Sea
- Great Yarmouth Outer Harbour, Great Yarmouth
- Port of Lowestoft, Lowestoft
- Southwold
- Port of Felixstowe, Felixstowe
- Port of Ipswich, Ipswich
- Mistley
- Harwich International Port, Harwich

=== Thames Estuary and Kent ===
- Brightlingsea
- Rochford, River Roach, Wallasea Island
- Port of London (includes Port of Tilbury)
- Sheerness
- Whitstable
- Sandwich
- Port of Ramsgate
- Port of Dover, Dover
- Folkestone

=== South Coast (including Isle of Wight) ===
- Rye Harbour
- Newhaven
- Shoreham-by-Sea
- Portsmouth
- Newport, Isle of Wight
- Port of Southampton, Southampton
- Cowes
- Lymington

=== West Country ===
- Port of Poole
- Portland Harbour
- Bridport Harbour, Bridport
- Exmouth
- Teignmouth
- Torquay
- Brixham
- Dartmouth
- Plymouth
- Fowey
- Par
- Charlestown
- Penryn
- Falmouth Docks, Falmouth
- Newlyn
- Penzance
- Hugh Town
- St Ives, Cornwall
- Padstow
- Appledore, Torridge, Devon

=== Bristol Channel (England) ===
- Bideford
- Barnstaple
- Watchet
- Port of Bridgwater, Bridgwater
- Port of Bristol, Bristol
- Avonmouth Docks, Avonmouth
- Sharpness
- Gloucester

=== Bristol Channel (Wales) ===
- Newport Docks, Newport
- Cardiff Docks, Cardiff
- Barry Docks, Barry
- Port of Port Talbot, Port Talbot
- Swansea Docks, Swansea
- Burry Port

=== Wales (west and north) ===
- Milford Haven Port, Milford Haven
- Fishguard Harbour, Fishguard
- Caernarfon harbour
- Port of Holyhead, Holyhead
- Mostyn
- Shotton

=== Northwest England ===
- Birkenhead
- Port of Manchester, Manchester
- Port Salford, Salford
- Port of Garston, Garston
- Port of Liverpool, see also List of Liverpool Docks
- Preston
- Fleetwood
- Heysham Port, Heysham
- Lancaster
- Royal Port of Barrow, Barrow-in-Furness
- Whitehaven
- Workington
- Maryport
- Silloth

=== Southwest Scotland ===
- Palnackie
- Irvine Harbour
- Stranraer
- Girvan
- Hunterston
- Glasgow
- Islay
- Lochaline
- Oban
- Greenock

=== Northwest Scotland ===
- Ullapool
- Stornoway

=== Northeast Scotland ===
- Scrabster
- Stromness
- Lerwick
- Kirkwall
- Scalloway
- Invergordon
- Inverness
- Wick
- Lossiemouth
- Macduff
- Peterhead

=== Southeast Scotland ===
- Kirkcaldy
- Inverkeithing
- Tayport
- Grangemouth
- Hound Point Terminal
- Leith
- Montrose
- Methil
- Rosyth
- Dundee
- Burntisland
- Kirkcaldy
- Perth

== See also ==
- List of ports and harbours in Scotland
- List of ports and harbours in Wales
- List of ports and harbours in Northern Ireland
- List of RNLI stations
- List of free ports § United Kingdom
- the Cinque Ports, and their Lord Warden
- List of vice-admirals of the coast
- List of Panamax ports § Great Britain
- List of busiest ports in Europe
- List of ferry operators § Europe
- List of ports
- List of ports and harbours of the Atlantic Ocean
- Canal & River Trust
