= Fishing industry in the United Kingdom =

Fishing industry in the United Kingdom may refer to:

- Fishing industry in England
- Fishing industry in Scotland
- Fishing industry in Wales
