= List of ports (disambiguation) =

List of ports may refer to any of the lists given in Lists of ports. It may also refer to:

- List of spaceports
- List of ports of entry in Nepal
- List of ports of entry in South Africa
- List of TCP and UDP port numbers
