= List of seaports of the Valencian Community =

Legend
Commercial port	Commercial port
Passengers port	Passengers port
Fishing port	Fishing port
Nautic port	Nautic base

This is a list of ports and harbours in the Valencian Community of Spain.

== Alicante (province) ==
=== Ports ===
- Ports of Alicante/Alacant

Port of Alicante
Port "Costa Blanca" (Alicante)
Port of "Varadero del Real Club de Regatas" (Alicante)
Port of Nueva Tabarca (island)

- Ports of Altea

Port of Altea
Port "La Galera" (Altea)
Port of L'Olla d'Altea (Altea)
Port of "Marina Greenwich" (Altea)

- Port of Benidorm
- Port "Les Bassetes" (Benissa)
- Ports of Calp (Calpe)

Port of Calp
Port "Port Blanco" (Calp)

- Port "La Illeta" (El Campello)
- Ports of Dénia

Port of Dénia
Port of "La Marina Dénia"

- Port of Marina of Las Dunas (Guardamar del Segura)
- Ports of Xàbia (Jávea)

Port of Xàbia
Port of "Nou Fontana" (Jávea)

- Port of Moraira (Teulada)
- Ports of Orihuela

Port "Dehesa Campoamor" (Orihuela)
Port "Cabo Roig" (Orihuela)

- Port "Torre de la Horadada" (Pilar de la Horadada)
- Port of Santa Pola
- Port of Torrevieja
- Port of Villajoyosa

== Castellón (province) ==
=== Ports ===
- Port of Benicarló
- Port of Burriana
- Port of Castellón
- Port of "Las Fuentes" (Alcossebre)
- Port of Oropesa
- Port of Peníscola (Peñíscola)
- Port of Vinaròs

=== Nautical Clubs ===
- Real Club Náutico de Castellón

Founded in 1933 (Official website)

== Valencia (province) ==
=== Ports ===
- Port of Cullera
- Port of Gandia
- Port "La Goleta" (Oliva)
- Port of El Perelló
- Port of La Pobla de Farnals
- Port of "Siles" (Canet de Berenguer)
- Port "Port Saplaya" (Alboraya)
- Port of Valencia
- Port of Sagunto

=== Nautical Clubs ===
- Real Club Náutico de Valencia

== See also ==
- List of seaports
- Harbor
- Port
