= Raahe Museum =

Museum in Raahe, Finland

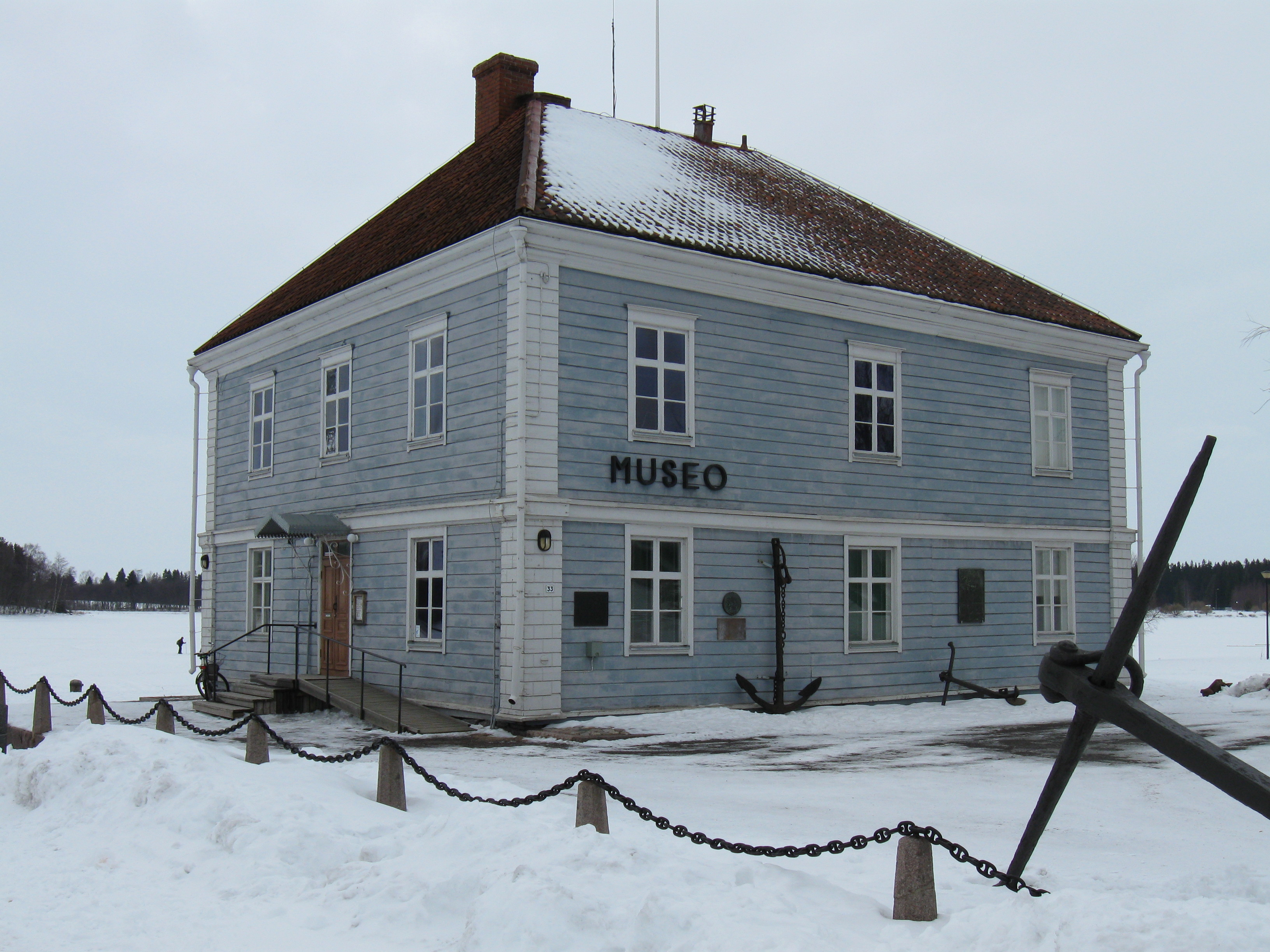
- Established: 1862
- Location: Raahe, Finland
- Coordinates: 64°41′15″N 024°28′17″E
- Type: Local history and culture
- Curator: Eija Turunen
- Website: raahenmuseo.fi

Raahe Museum (or the Museum of Raahe) is the oldest museum of local history and culture in Finland. The museum is located in the town of Raahe, in Oulu province.

== History ==
The Museum of Raahe was founded in 1862 by Carl Robert Ehrström.

From the beginning of the 20th century, the museum has been located in the old customs house, which was built in 1848 and originally served as a place for hiring seamen during the Age of Sail. The building has been preserved almost in its original condition.

== Collections ==
The collection found in Raahe Museum reflects the history of Raahe as a town of ship builders and seafarers.

The main collection of the museum consists of donations made in the 19th century. These encompass unusual natural items and other objects from foreign countries, including exotic souvenirs brought to Raahe by sailors.

The collection has been expanded to include items of cultural history, with many relating to Raahe's history. Many of these items, such as the miniature sailing boats and paintings thereof, reflect the maritime history of the town.

The collection also includes weapons, coins, textiles and toys from different eras.

=== Rarities ===
There are several rarities among the artifacts such as the wooden sculptures which were made for the first church of Raahe in the 17th century. These colourful and unique sculptures were made by a French sculptor, Mikael Balt, who was invited to work in Raahe by the burgomaster, Henrik Corte, in 1655. They date from medieval Catholicism and mostly represent the Baroque style. Balt's sculptures in the Raahe Museum include angels, saints and many other figures and symbols from the Bible.

=== The Old Gentleman ===
InterWiki: fi

The most famous treasure of the museum is "The Old Gentleman", the oldest surviving diving suit in the world. It is located in one of the buildings of the Raahe museum, the former crown granary. It was made of calf leather and dates from the 18th century. Its exact origin is unknown but the foot parts suggest a Finnish origin.

The suit, which was used in short underwater work like checking the conditions of the bottom of a ship, was donated to Raahe Museum by Captain Johan Leufstadius (1829–1906), who was a master mariner, merchant and ship owner.

The conservator of Raahe Museum, Jouko Turunen, tailored a perfect copy of the old suit in 1988, fittingly called The Young Gentleman. The copy has been successfully tested underwater several times.

== Other museums operated by Raahe Museum ==
The Raahe Museum also operates The Shipowner's Home Interior Museum and The Old Pharmacy Museum, which are both situated in the centre of the town near the Museum of Raahe. Ojala Homestead Museum, Olkijoki Armistice Cottage and Saloinen Museum in the wider Raahe area are also operated by Raahe Museum.
