= Erik Ehrström =

Finnish lawyer and diplomat

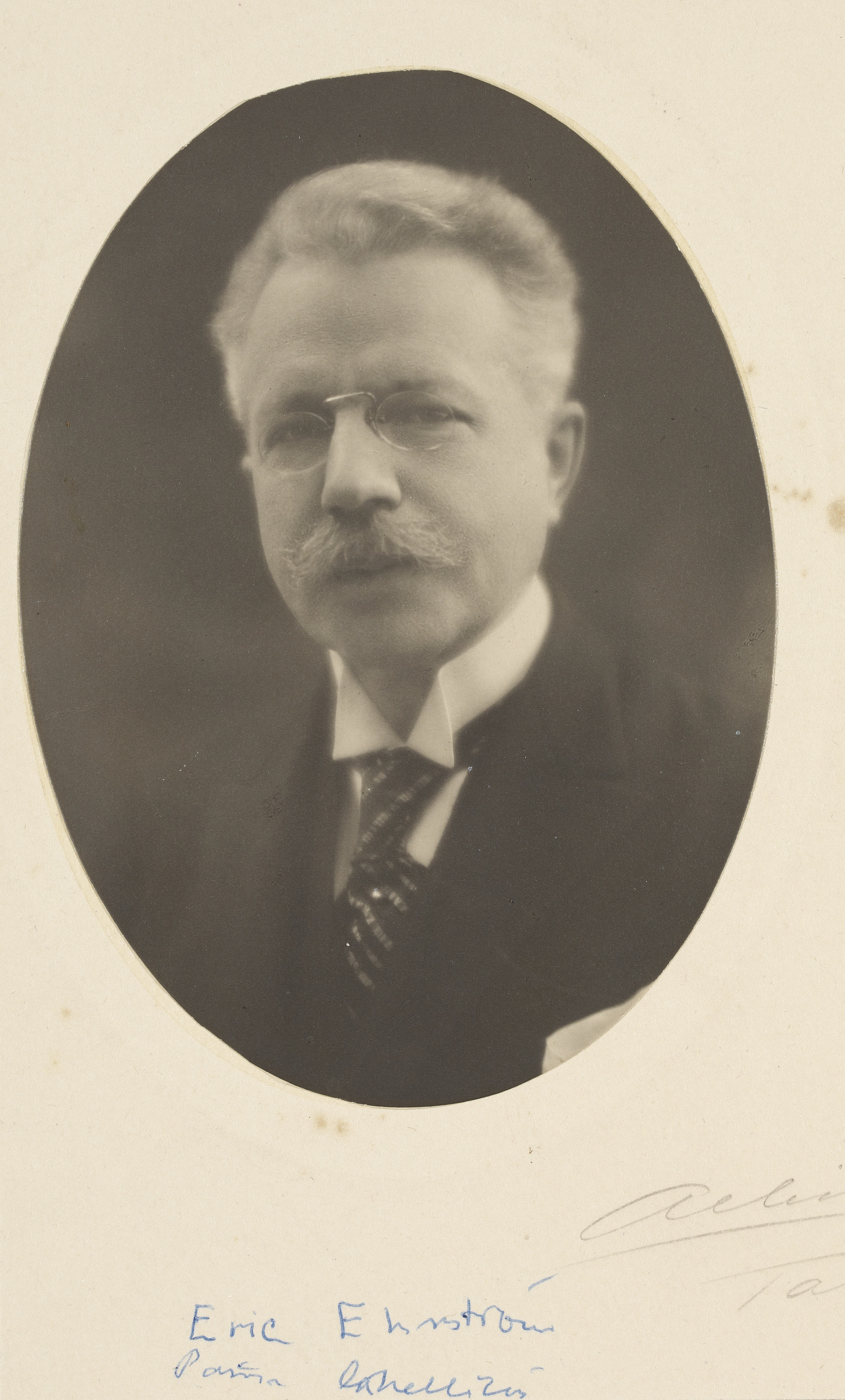
Erik Ehrström in the late 1910s.

Erik Gustaf Ehrström (26 March 1869 in Helsinki – 8 March 1947 in Paris, France) was a Finnish lawyer and a diplomat.

Ehrström's parents were professor, senator and procurator Carl Gustaf Ehrström and Fredrika Ottilia Amalia Orrman. He graduated from the Swedish Normal Lyceum in Helsinki in 1886 and studied at the University of Helsinki and graduated as a Bachelor of Philosophy in 1889, a Master of Philosophy in 1890 and a Bachelor of Law in 1896. He also worked as a student teacher at the Appeals Court

Ehrström lived in France from 1899 and held various positions in politics and economics. After Finland became independent, he was employed by the Finnish Foreign Service 1918–1926. Ehrström acted as secretary of the delegation in the recognition of the independence of Finland in February 1918 in Paris; the delegation included procurator Lorenzo Kihlman, Consul Eugen Wolff and Senator Rudolf Holsti. Ehrström was then appointed in July 1918 as Representative of Finland to France and the Netherlands, and he worked until 1919. Last Ehrström acted as Envoy in Warsaw from 1922 to 1926. In December 1919 he received the titles of Special envoy and Sovereign Minister.

Ehrström was married in 1907 to French-born Marie-Antoinette Vincent.
