= List of ports and harbours in Northern Ireland =

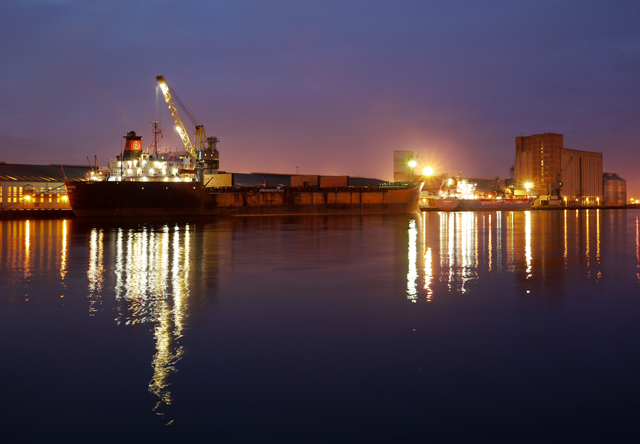
Belfast docks

This is a list of the seaports in Northern Ireland

- Ardglass
- Ballycastle, County Antrim
- Bangor, County Down
- Belfast Harbour
- Carrickfergus
- Coleraine
- Kilkeel
- Larne
- Londonderry Port
- Portaferry
- Portavogie
- Portstewart
- Strangford
- Warrenpoint

== See also ==
- List of ports in Ireland
- List of ports in Great Britain
- List of ports and harbours in Scotland
- List of ports and harbours in Wales
