= Ehrenström =

Ehrenström is a North European surname. Notable people with the surname include:

- Anna Ehrenström (1786–1857), Swedish poet
- Johan Albrecht Ehrenström (1762–1847), Finnish politician and official
- Marianne Ehrenström (1773–1867), Swedish writer, singer, painter, and pianist

== See also ==
- Ehrström, a Finnish surname
