= Carl Robert Ehrström =

Finnish doctor, bacteriologist and archaeologist

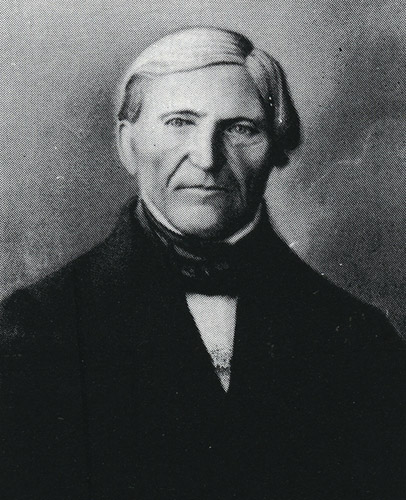
Carl Robert Ehrström

Carl Robert Ehrström (1803–1881) was a Finnish medical doctor, bacteriologist and archaeologist.

Ehrström became interested in science and culture at a young age. He got medical training and worked as a practicing doctor and scientist. During the 1850s he formed an early hypothesis of how microbes might relate to disease. Unfortunately, the papers describing his studies were ignored or misplaced in academic bureaucracy.Thesis 1840. Besides medical science, Ehrström was also very interested in local history. He researched Finnish folk culture and arranged archaeological expeditions in northern Finland.

In 1854, he moved to the coastal town of Raahe to work as a county doctor. At that time, sea trading was becoming the town's most important form of livelihood. Sailors brought interesting souvenirs from abroad and Ehrström started thinking of establishing a museum based on those curiosities.

In March 1862, Ehrström started a campaign to collect donations from the wealthy citizens of Raahe. In a few months he had collected a considerable sum of money and gained wide publicity for his museum project. His achievement, the first local Finnish museum of history, culture and natural sciences, Raahe Museum, started its activities in October 1862.
