= List of ports in Finland =

Main sea ports of Finland

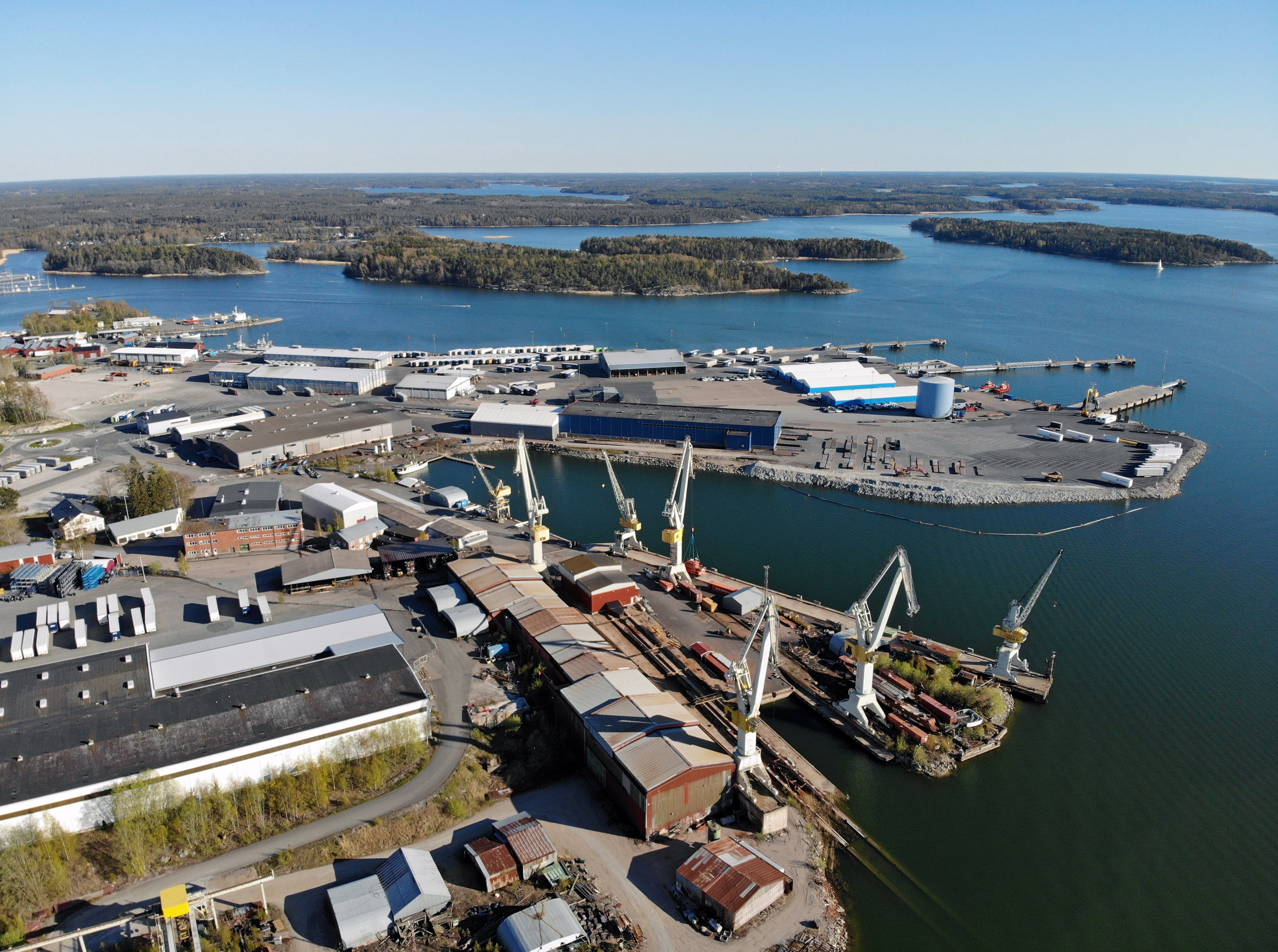
Port of Uusikaupunki

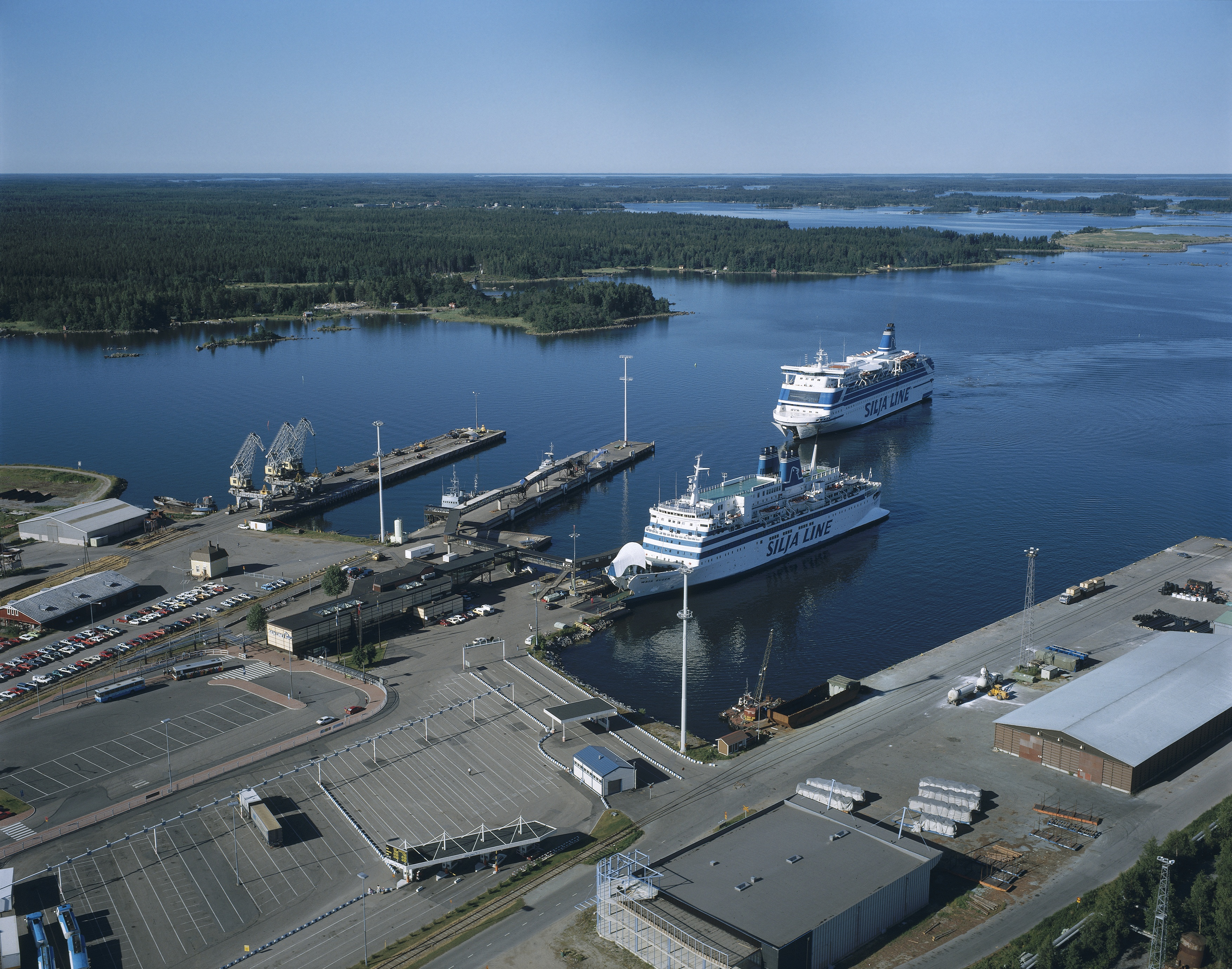
Port of Vaasa

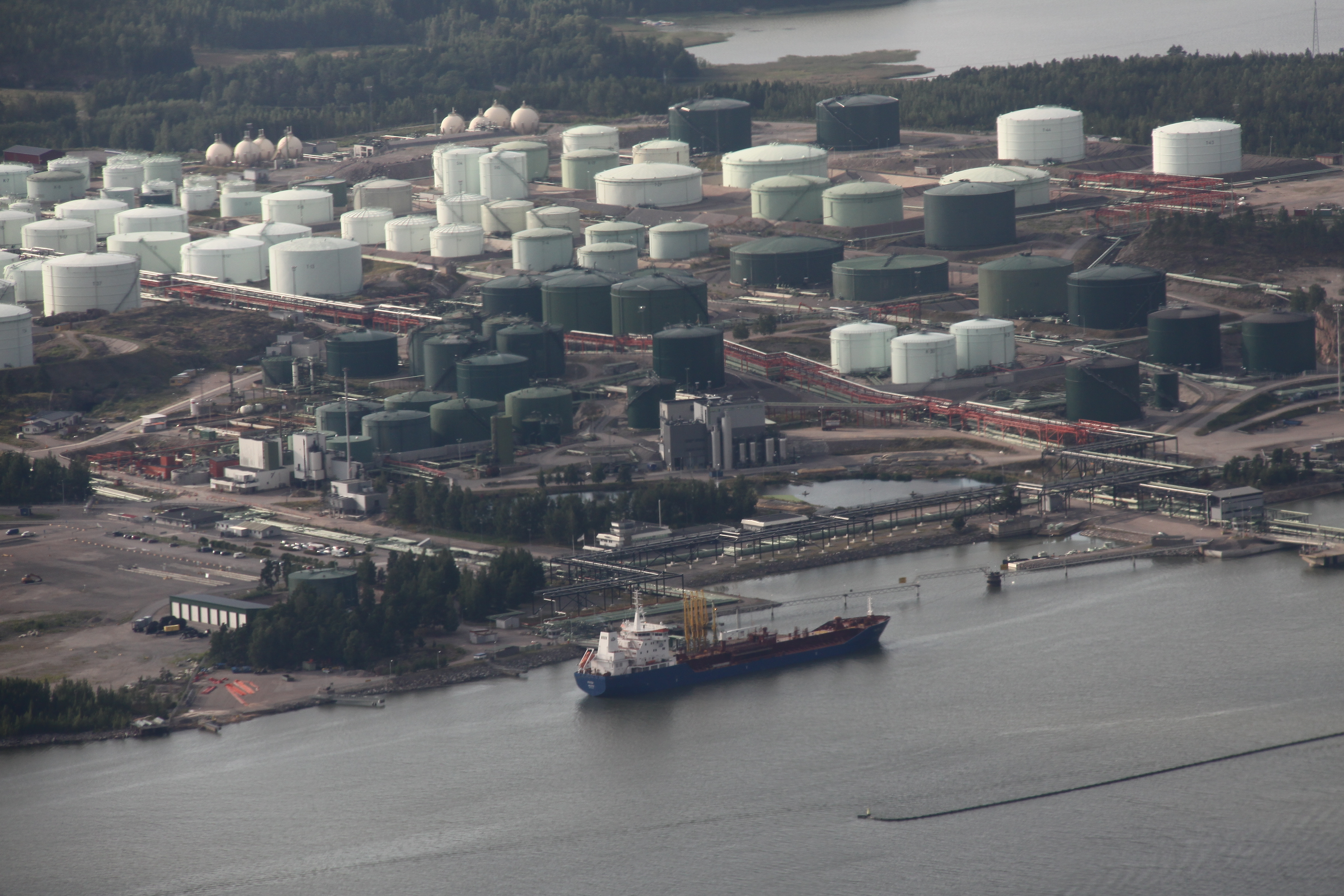
Port of Kilpilahti (Sköldvik)

This list of ports in Finland includes the largest cargo and passenger sea ports in Finland by international transport volumes. It excludes individual harbours (such as Vuosaari Harbour, part of the Port of Helsinki), military bases, marinas and inland waterway ports (such as the Port of Lappeenranta).

Port	Alternative name	Region	Passengers millions (Note: Total of departures and arrivals (2018); excludes ports handling <100K passengers)	Cargo million tons (Note: Total of imports and exports (2018))
Hamina-Kotka		Gulf of Finland		15.1
Hanko		Gulf of Finland		4.8
Helsinki		Gulf of Finland	12.6	14.6
Ingå		Gulf of Finland		1.9
Jakobstad		Gulf of Bothnia		1.1
Kaskinen		Gulf of Bothnia		1.1
Kemi	Ajos	Gulf of Bothnia		1.9
Kilpilahti	Sköldvik	Gulf of Finland		21.4
Kokkola		Gulf of Bothnia		6.7
Loviisa	Valko	Gulf of Finland		(Note: Included in the Helsinki figure, after 2017 merger)
Mariehamn (Åland)		Archipelago Sea	3.5	0.05
Naantali		Archipelago Sea	0.2	5.7
Oulu		Gulf of Bothnia		2.9
Pori		Gulf of Bothnia		3.5
Raahe		Gulf of Bothnia		5.2
Rauma		Gulf of Bothnia		5.8
Tornio	Röyttä	Gulf of Bothnia		3.0
Turku		Archipelago Sea	2.6	2.1
Uusikaupunki	Hepokari	Gulf of Bothnia		2.5
Vaasa		Gulf of Bothnia	0.2	0.9
