= Lorenzo Kihlman =

Finnish lawyer

Mauritz Lorenzo Kihlman (11 February 1861 Jakobstad – 15 May 1949 Helsinki) was a Finnish lawyer who acted as a procurator for Finland and after becoming independent in Finland as a diplomat and a member of the Supreme Administrative Court.

Kihlman's parents were Professor Alfred Kihlman and Hilda Wilhelmina Augusta Forssell.

He became an Aultan of the Court of Appeal in 1885 and served in 1885–1887 at the Turku Court of Appeal and from 1888 at the Vaasa Court of Appeal, where he was dismissed in 1904.

As a lawyer in Helsinki, Kihlman acted in 1904–1905, after 1905, he became after 1905 general strike in 1906 proctor and 1908 procurator. Upon divorcing from the procurator's office in 1909, Kihlman acted as a lawyer in 1910–1917.

After becoming independent in Finland, he served as Chargé d'Affaires in Paris in 1918 and in Madrid in 1918–1919 and then as a member of the Supreme Administrative Court from 1919 to 1931.

Kihlman took part in spiritual work, among others, as chairman of the Swedish YMCA in Helsinki from 1927 to 1929, as a member of the board of directors of the Förbundet för Svenskt församlingsarbete i Finland and vice chairman of the Board of Directors of the Deaconess Institute in Helsinki from 1929 to 1943.

He also worked for the creation of old-age homes.

Kihlman's spouse since 1889 was Ida Mathilda Ekström (died in 1932).

Literature researcher Erik Kihlman and writer Bertel Kihlman (1898–1977) were their children.
