= List of ports in Portugal =

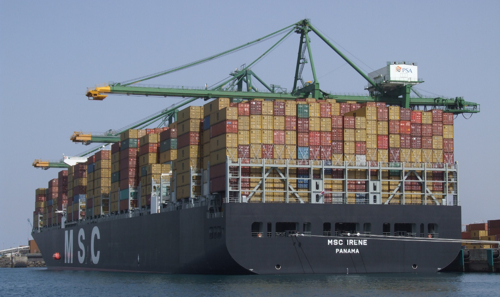
Port of Sines is the sixth busiest transhipment port in Europe.

The next list is a list of the main cargo ports in Portugal, also including ports located in the Azores and Madeira islands. These ports are included in APP – Associação dos Portos de Portugal, a non-profit association with the objective of exchanging information and debates, contributing to the modernization of the national system of cargo ports. The ports are listed by TEU units capacity.

== List ==
Port	Image	Region	Information
Port of Sines		Setúbal District	
Port of Leixoes		Porto District	
Port of Lisbon		Lisbon District	
Port of Setúbal		Setúbal District	
Port of Figueira da Foz		Coimbra District	
Port of Aveiro		Aveiro District	
Port of Viana do Castelo		Viana do Castelo District	
Madeira
Port of Caniçal		Madeira Island	
Azores
Port of Praia da Vitória		Praia da Vitória	
Port of Ponta Delgada		Ponta Delgada	

== See also ==
- Transportation in Portugal
