= Edström =

Edström or Edstrom is a surname of Swedish origin. Notable people with the surname include:

- Adam Edström (born 2000), Swedish ice hockey player
- Carl-Johan Edström (born 1967), Swedish Air Force major general
- Christian Edstrom, Swedish American professional co-driver (rallying)
- Dave Edstrom, American former decathlete
- David Edstrom (born 2005), Swedish ice hockey player
- Ester Edström, Swedish diver who competed in the 1912 Summer Olympics
- Kristina Edström, Swedish inorganic specialising in battery technology
- Peter David Edstrom (1873–1938), Swedish American sculptor
- Ralf Edström, Swedish former footballer
- Sigfrid Edström (1870–1964), Swedish industrial and sports official
- Sonja Edström, Swedish former cross country skier who competed
- Harold and Everett Edstrom, founders of Hal Leonard Corporation

== See also ==
- Waggener Edstrom Worldwide, American based privately owned public relations agency
