= List of ports in Ireland =

Map showing the location of the ports listed on this page.

This is a list of seaports around the coast of the island of Ireland, including those found in Northern Ireland.

== List by coast ==
=== East coast ===
- Rosslare
- Arklow
- Wicklow
- Dún Laoghaire
- Dublin
- Howth
- Drogheda
- Dundalk
- Greenore
- Warrenpoint
- Belfast
- Larne

=== North coast ===
- Coleraine
- Londonderry (Foyle)
- Rathmullan

=== West coast ===
- Bantry Bay
- Dingle
- Fenit
- Foynes
- Galway
- Killybegs
- Rossaveal
- Kilronan
- Kilrush
- Limerick
- Shannon Foynes Port
- Sligo Port

=== South coast ===
- Castletown Berehaven
- Kinsale
- Cobh
- Ringaskiddy
- Tivoli
- Cork
- Youghal
- Dungarvan
- Waterford
- New Ross
- Dunmore East
- Valentia

== See also ==
- Coastal landforms of Ireland
