= List of ports of entry in Nepal =

This is a list of ports of entry in Nepal.

== Airports ==
1. Tribhuvan International Airport

== Land border crossings ==
=== India border ===
(from east to west)

1. Pashupatinagar
2. Kankarbhitta
3. Bhadrapur
4. Biratnagar
5. Setobandha
6. Rajbiraj
7. Siraha
8. Jaleshwar
9. Malangawa
10. Gaur
11. Birganj
12. Siddharthanagar
13. Taulihawa
14. Krishnanagar
15. Koilabas
16. Nepalgunj
17. Rajapur
18. Prithivipur
19. Dhangadhi
20. Mahendranagar
21. Mahakali
22. Darchula

=== China border ===
The following are some trails connecting the two countries:

1. Olanchungola
2. Kimathaka
3. Kodari
4. Larke pass
5. Hilsa
6. Tikar
7. Namja
8. Rasuwagadhi

== See also ==
- Border checkpoint
- Port of entry
