= List of ports in Belgium =

Belgium has four sea ports and a range of inland ports.

== Sea ports ==
- Port of Antwerp (Antwerp), www.portofantwerp.be
- Port of Bruges-Zeebrugge (Bruges/Zeebrugge), www.zeebruggeport.be
- Port of Ghent (Ghent), www.portofghent.be
- Port of Ostend (Ostend), www.portofoostende.be
- Port of Genk (Genk), www.havengenk.be

== Inland ports ==
- Port of Brussels (Brussels), www.portofbrussels.be
- Port of Charleroi (Charleroi), charleroi.portautonome.be
- Port of La Louvière (La Louvière), www.le-paco.be
- Port of Liège (Liège), www.portdeliege.be
