= List of ports in Albania =

This is a list of ports in Albania.

== Main ports ==
Name	Cargo Handled (FY2021)		Passenger Traffic (FY2021)	
Name	tonnes	% Increase (over previous FY)	total	% Increase (over previous FY)
Durrës	4,438,611	+14.3%	688,586	+121.2%
Vlorë	121,743	-34.4%	109,969	+76.8%
Sarandë	226,309	-5.4%	64,202	+1,048.7%
Shëngjin	–	–	–	–

== Petroleum ports ==
Name	Capacity (Tanker Accommodation)		Services
Name	loa	depth	Services
Petrolifera	190 m	10 m	oil storage
MBM Port	250 m	11.7 m	oil storage

== Tourism ports ==
Name	Capacity (yacht accommodation)		
Name	berths	loa	depth
Name	Durrës Yacht & Marina		
Vlora Bay Marina			
Saranda Bay Marina			
Orikum Marina	70	15 m	2.5 m
Porto Albania	690	75 m	

== Gallery ==
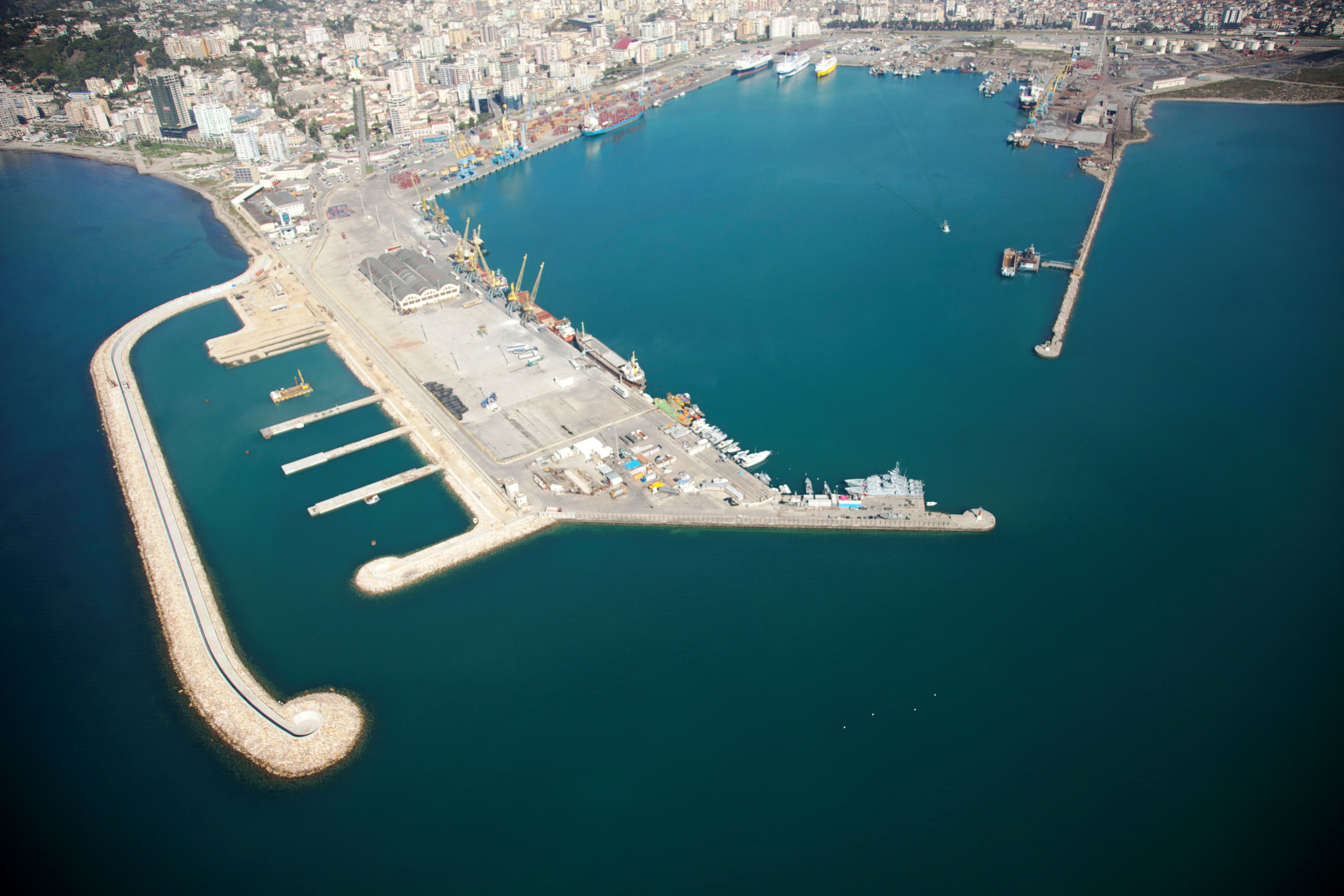
Durrës Port

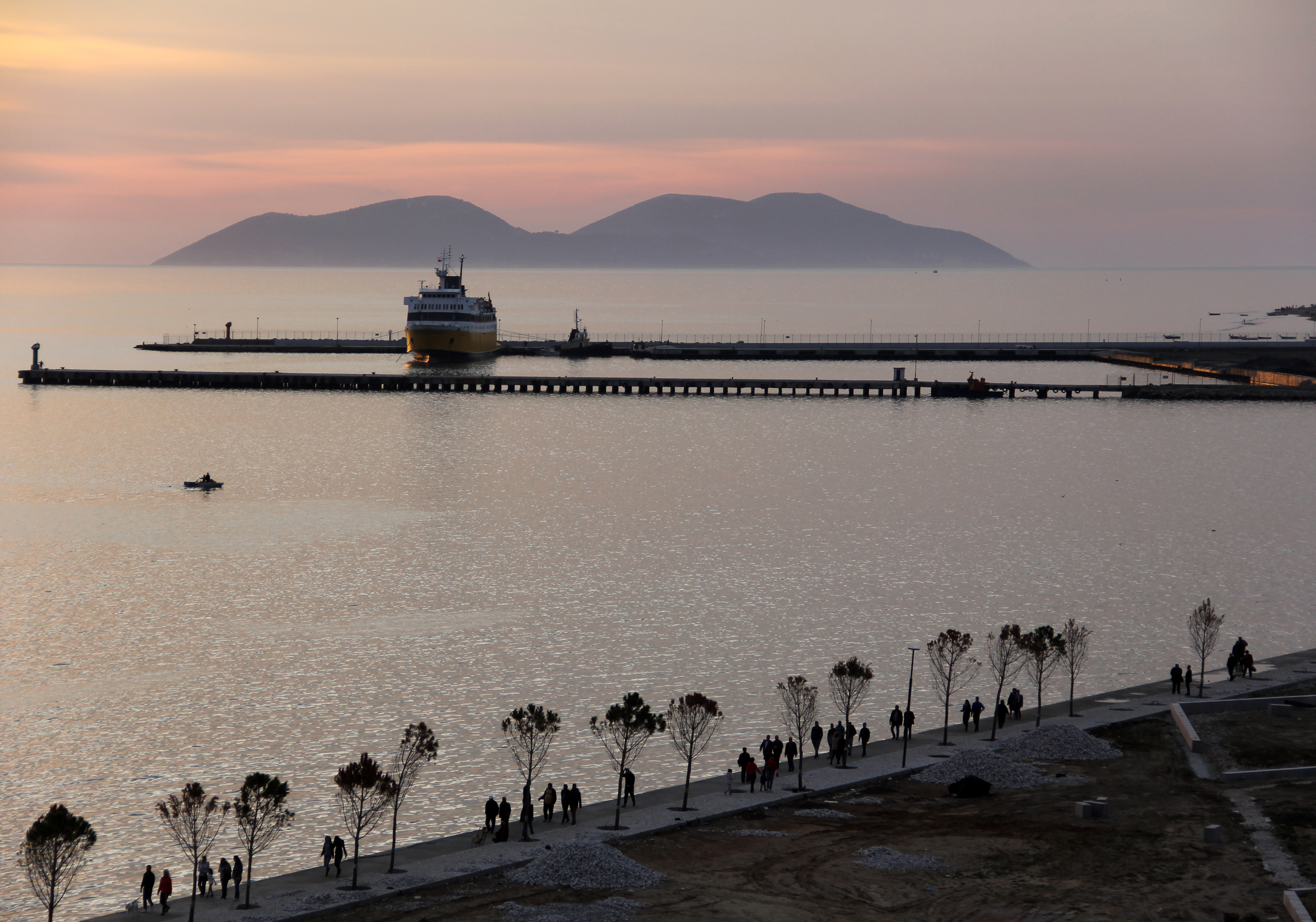
Vlorë Port

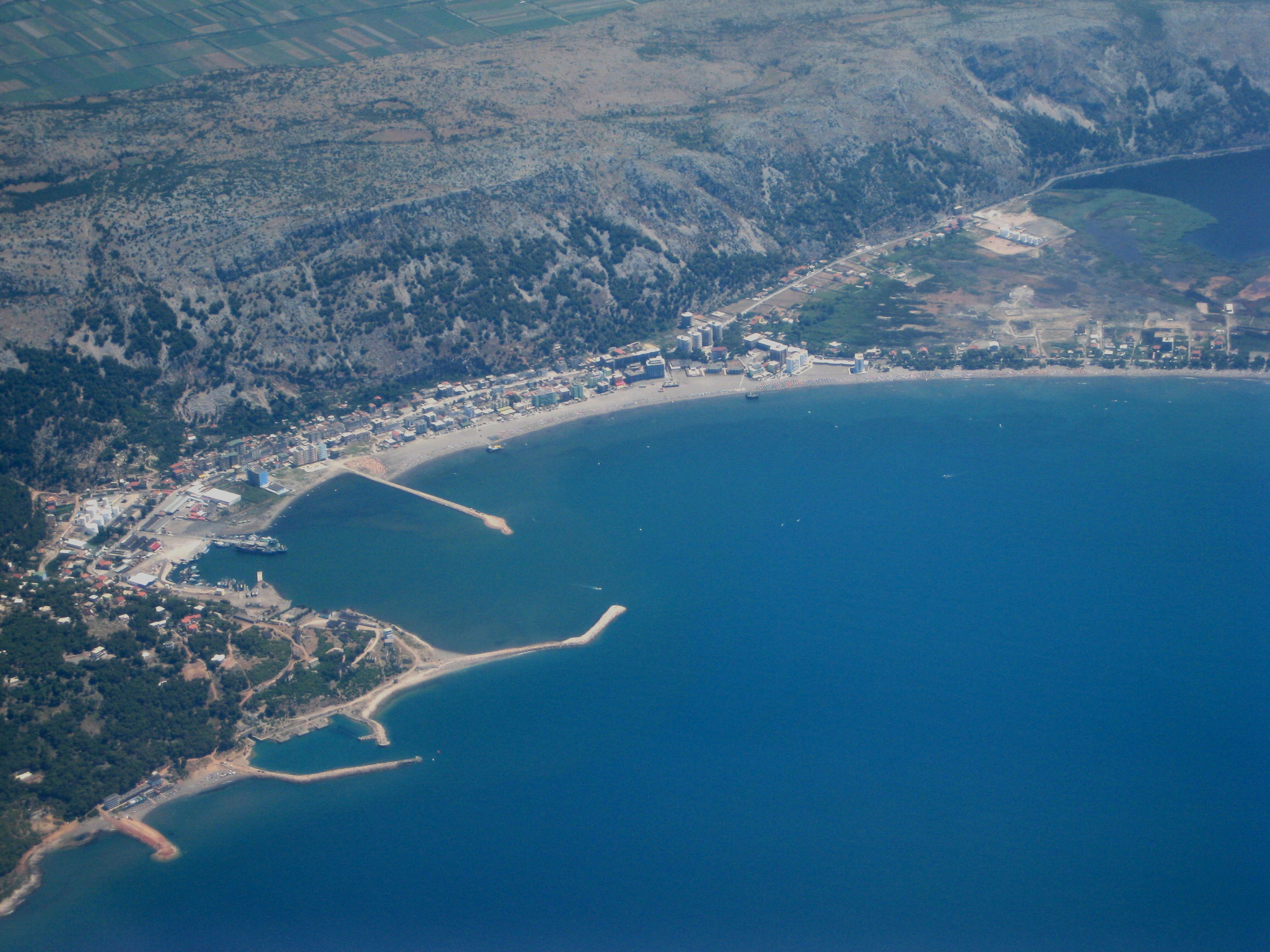
Shëngjin Port

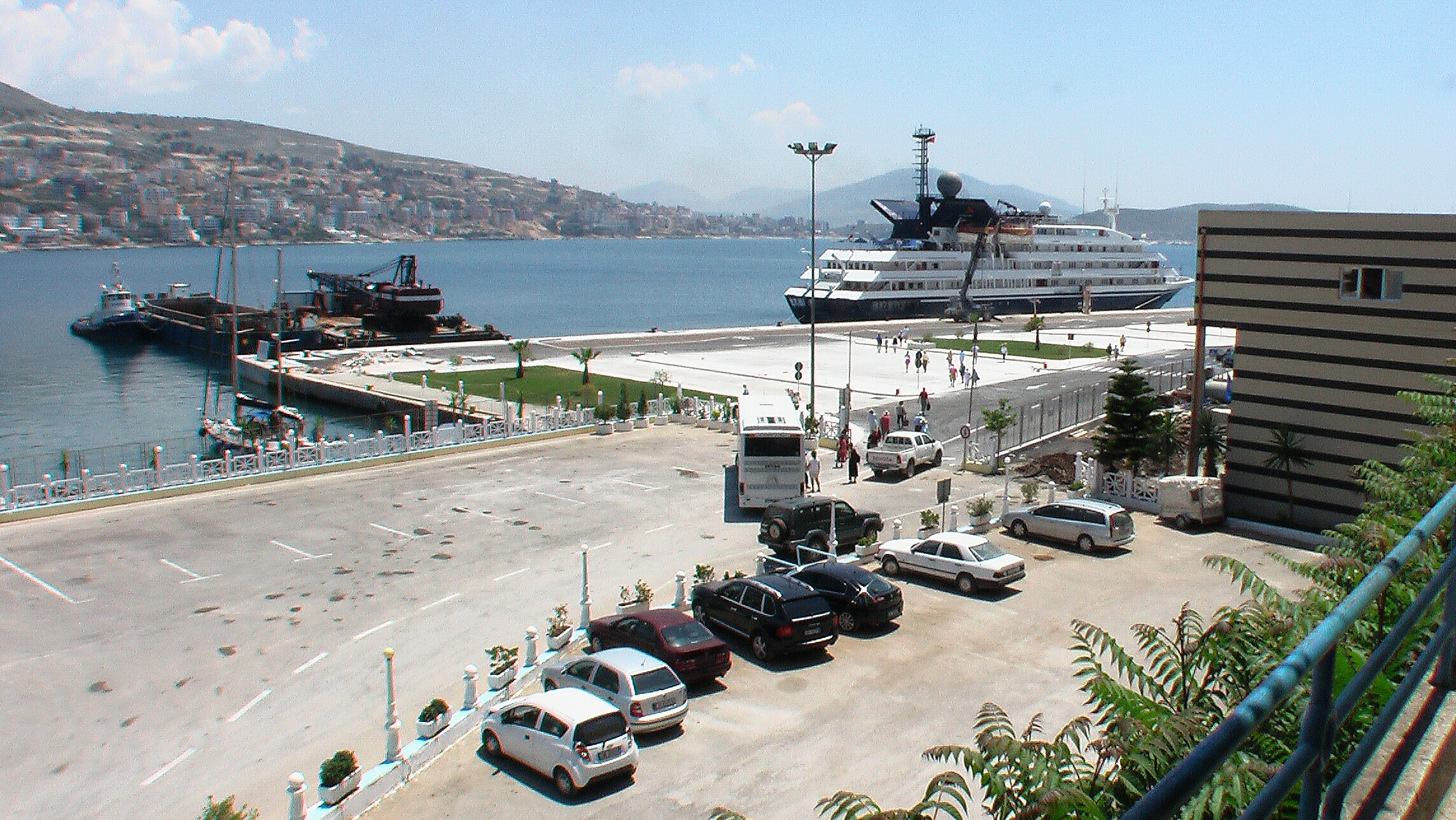
Sarandë Port
