= List of seaports in Mexico =

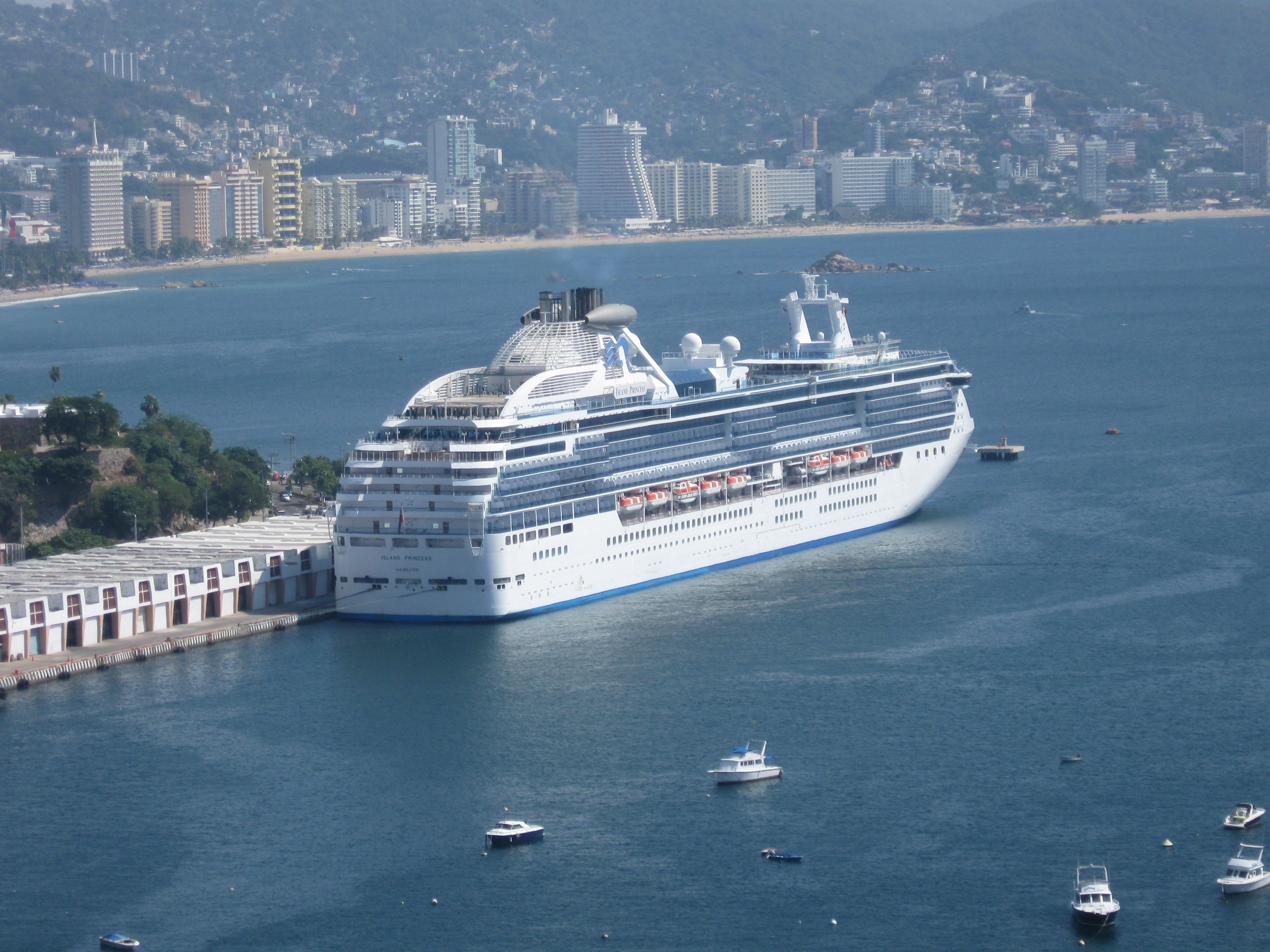
Cruising at the International Transatlantic Port Lieutenant José Azueta

This is a list of seaports in Mexico.

== Atlantic Ocean (Gulf of Mexico and Caribbean Sea) ==
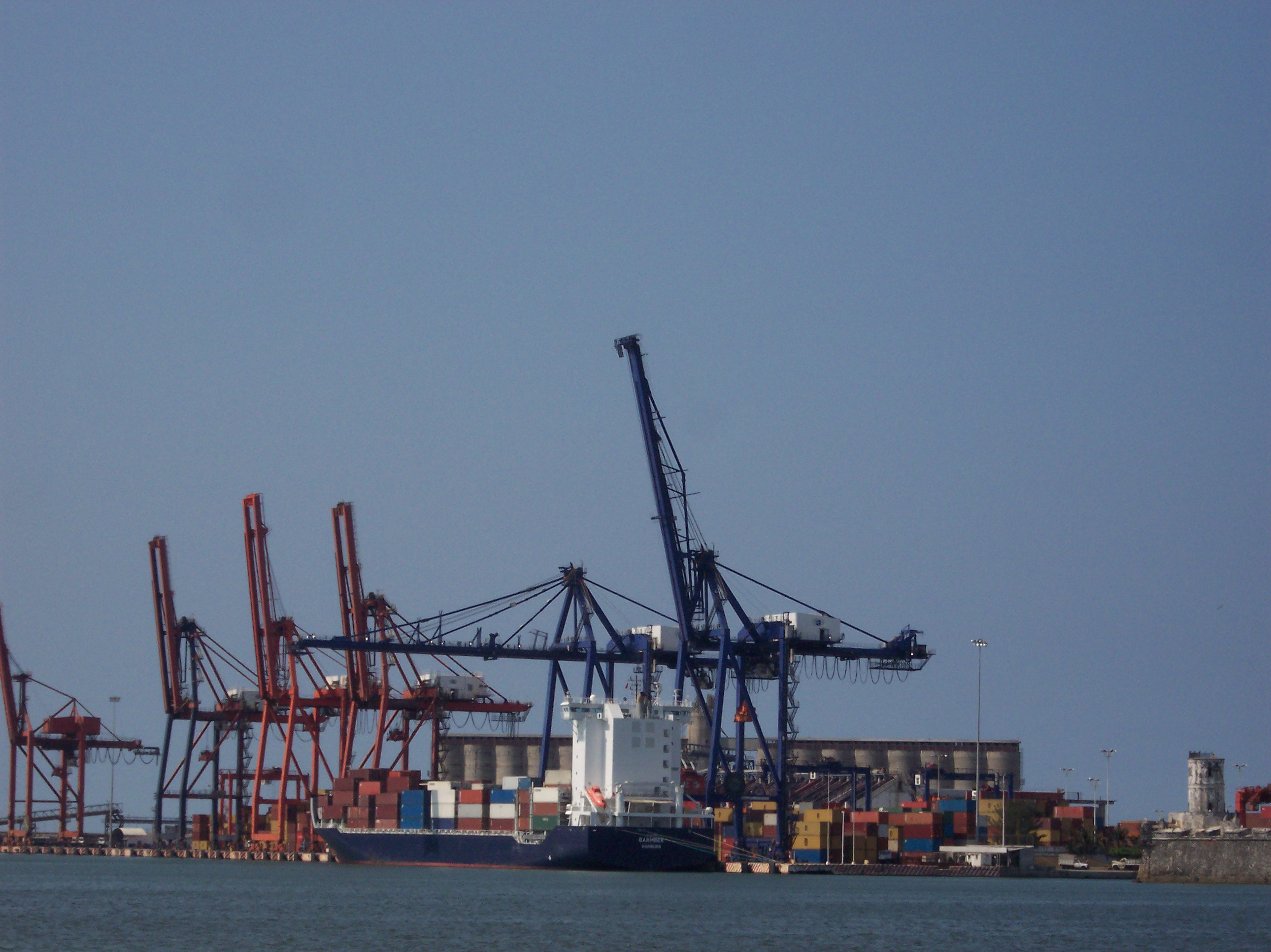
Port of Veracruz

- Altamira, Tamaulipas
- Río Largartos, Yucatán
- Port of Progreso, Yucatán
- Alvarado, Veracruz
- Tamiahua, Veracruz
- Barra de Tuxpan, Veracruz
- Tecolutla, Veracruz
- Tuxpan, Veracruz
- Anton Lizardo, Veracruz
- Veracruz, Veracruz
- Coatzacoalcos, Veracruz
- Celestún, Yucatán
- Sisal, Yucatán
- Dzilam de Bravo, Yucatán
- Las Coloradas, Yucatán
- Isla Mujeres, Quintana Roo
- Cozumel, Quintana Roo
- Chetumal, Quintana Roo
- Progreso, Yucatán
- Cancún, Quintana Roo
- Sánchez Magallanes, Tabasco
- Puerto dos Bocas, Tabasco
- Barra Chiltepec, Tabasco
- La Barra, Tabasco
- Ciudad del Carmen, Campeche
- Isla Aguada, Campeche
- Champotón, Campeche
- Campeche, Campeche

== Pacific Ocean (including the Gulf of California) ==
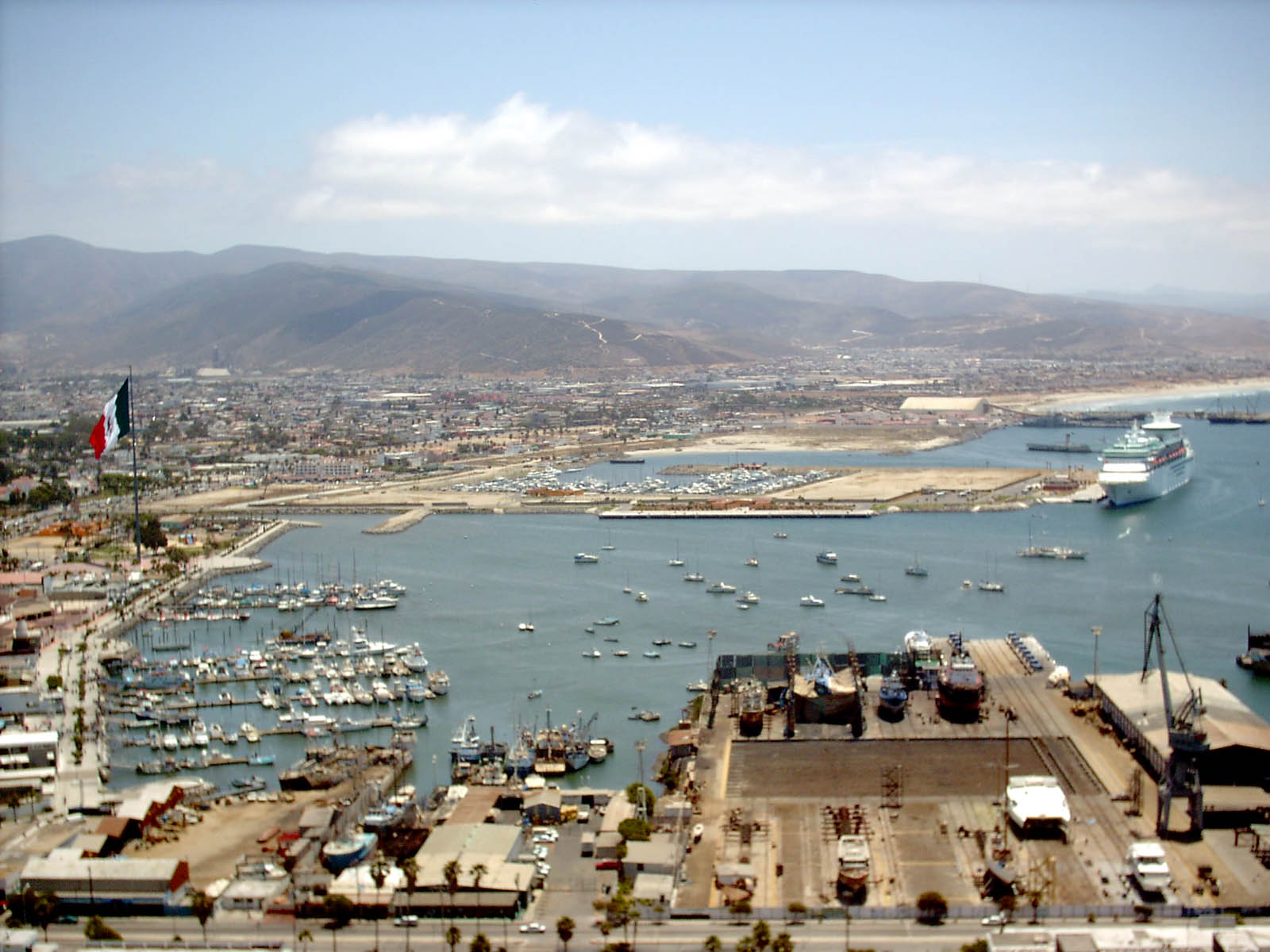
Port of Ensenada

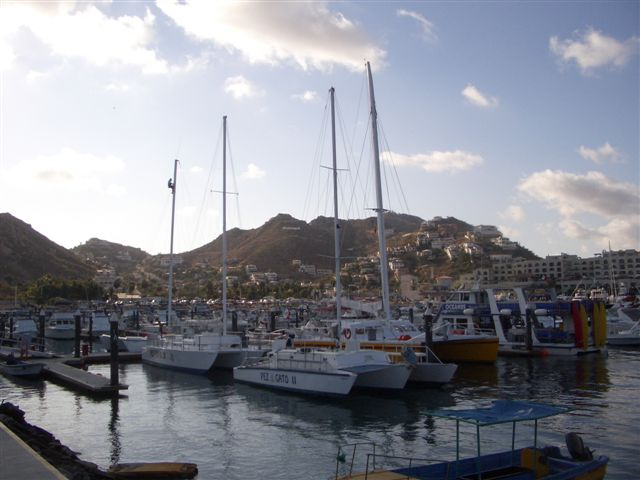
Cabo San Lucas Marina 2004.

- Puerto Salina, Baja California
- Port of Acapulco, Guerrero
- Cabo San Lucas, Baja California Sur
- Puerto Chiapas, Chiapas
- Port of Ensenada, Baja California
- Port of Guaymas, Sonora
- La Paz, Baja California Sur
- Port of Lázaro Cárdenas, Michoacán
- Port of Manzanillo, Colima
- Mazatlán, Sinaloa
- Port of Salina Cruz, Oaxaca
- Puerto San Carlos, Baja California Sur
- Puerto Vallarta, Jalisco
- Topolobampo, Sinaloa

Mexico's 10 busiest freight ports by total cargo tonnage

Port	Total Cargo (Metric Tons) - 2013
Lazaro Cardenas	30,781,903
Manzanillo	25,923,821
Veracruz	20,530,234
Altamira	15,333,440
Isla de Cedros	15,234,436
Punta Venado	9,064,845
Guerrero Negro	7,573,513
Coatzacoalcos	7,052,059
Guaymas	5,832,015
