= Port of Raahe =

Cargo port in Finland

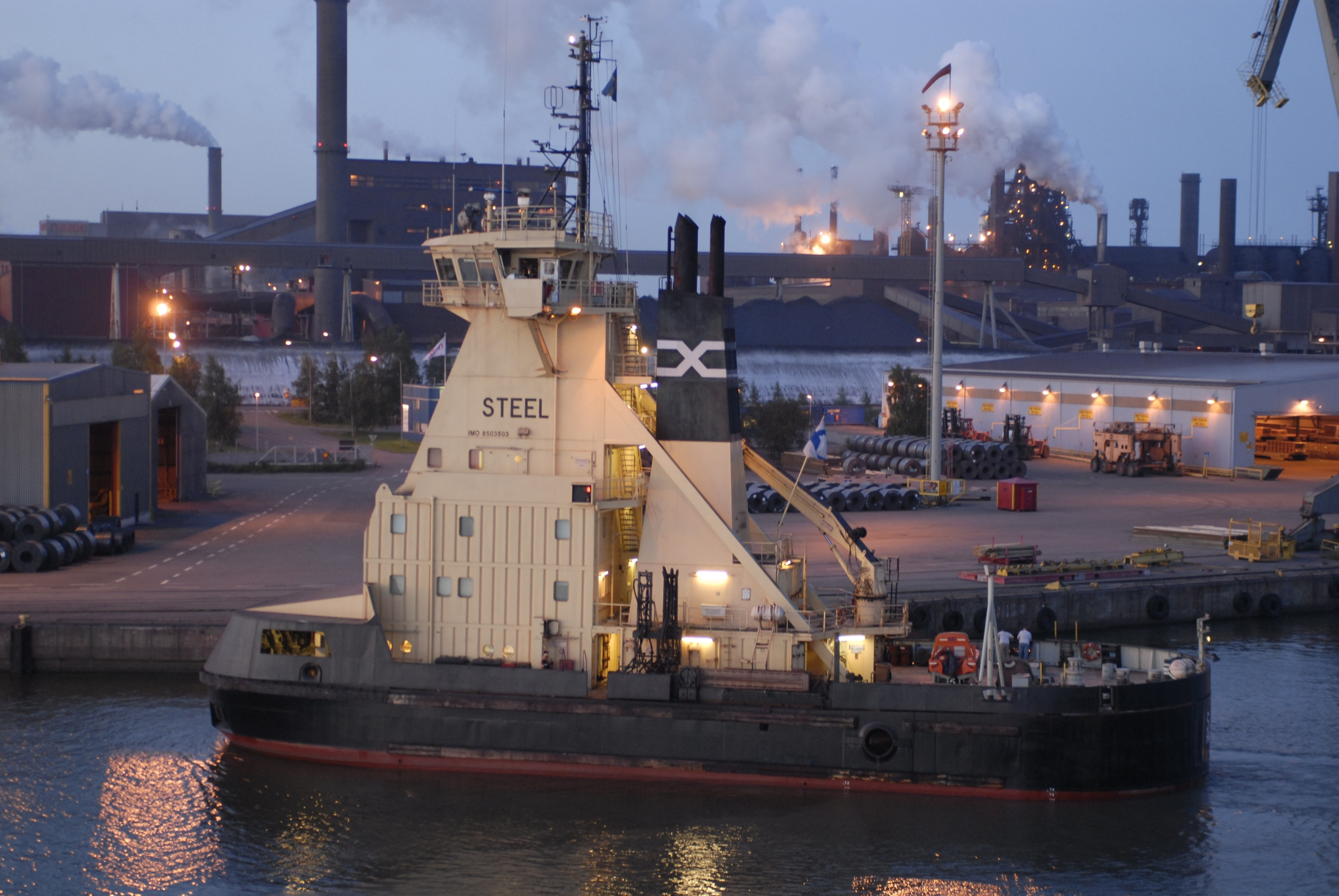
- Port of Raahe, with pusher tug Steel in the foreground
- Click on the map for a fullscreen view
- Port of Raahe (Finland)
- Native name: Raahen satama

Location
- Country: Finland
- Location: Raahe
- Coordinates: 64.6607°N 24.4069°E
- UN/LOCODE: FI RAA

Details
- Operated by: Raahen Satama Oy
- Type of harbour: coastal breakwater
- Draft depth: max. 10 metres (33 ft) depth

Statistics
- Annual cargo tonnage: c. 5.2m tons (int'l) (2018)
- Website https://www.raahensatama.fi/en

The Port of Raahe is a cargo port located in the city of Raahe on the west coast of Finland, on the eastern shore of the Bothnian Bay.

In 2018, the port handled c. 5.2 million tons of international cargo, of which over 80% was imports. This makes Raahe the fourth-busiest import port in Finland, by tonnage.

== Specifications ==
The port comprises the following facilities:

- Deep-water quay: RO-RO ramp and two berths, depth 10.0 metres (32.8 ft)
- Lapaluoto harbour: three berths, depth 8.0 metres (26.2 ft)
- SSAB steelworks harbour: six berths, depth 7.8–8.0 metres (25.6–26.2 ft)
- Three quay cranes and three mobile cranes
