= Raahe =

Town in North Ostrobothnia, Finland

Raahe Brahestad
- Town
- Raahen kaupunki Brahestads stad
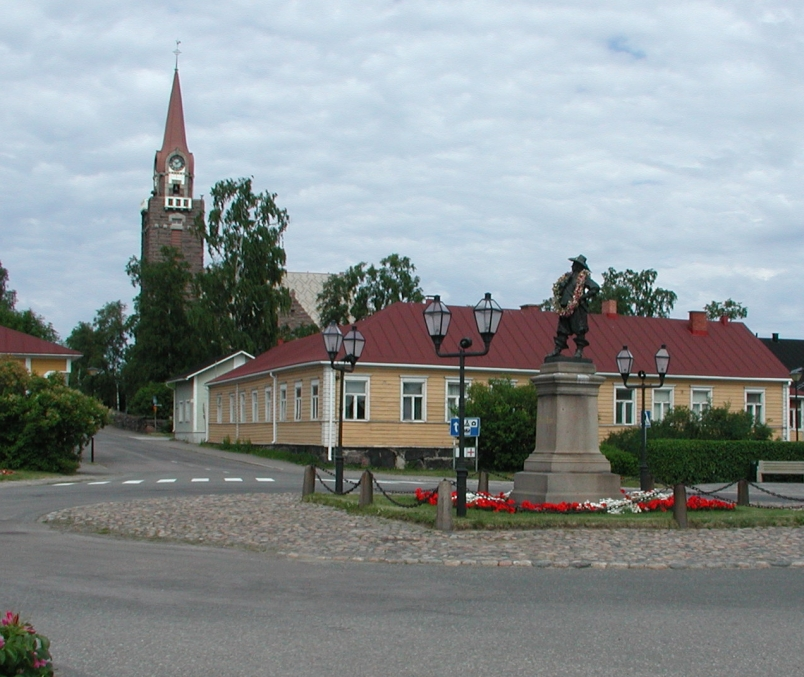
- Raahe Church and statue of Per Brahe

- Coat of arms

- Location of Raahe in Finland
- Interactive map of Raahe
- Coordinates: 64°41′N 024°28′E
- Country: Finland
- Region: North Ostrobothnia
- Sub-region: Raahe
- Charter: 1649
- Named for: Per Brahe the Younger

Government
  - City manager: Leena Mikkola-Riekkinen

Area (2018-01-01)
  - Total: 1,889.00 km^{2} (729.35 sq mi)
  - Land: 1,013.78 km^{2} (391.42 sq mi)
  - Water: 870.77 km^{2} (336.21 sq mi)
  - Rank: 77th largest in Finland

Population (2025-12-31)
  - Total: 23,413
  - Rank: 43rd largest in Finland
  - Density: 23.09/km^{2} (59.8/sq mi)

Population by native language
  - Finnish: 95.1% (official)
  - Swedish: 0.1%
  - Others: 4.8%

Population by age
  - 0 to 14: 18.1%
  - 15 to 64: 56%
  - 65 or older: 25.9%
- Time zone: UTC+02:00 (EET)
  - Summer (DST): UTC+03:00 (EEST)
- Website: www.raahe.fi/en

Raahe (Finnish: [ˈrɑːhe]; Swedish: Brahestad; Finland Swedish: [brɑːheˌstɑːd]) is a town in Finland, located on the western coast of the country. Raahe is situated in the North Ostrobothnia region, along the Gulf of Bothnia. The population of Raahe is approximately 23,000, while the sub-region has a population of approximately 31,000. It is the 43rd most populous municipality in Finland.

Founded in 1649 by the Swedish statesman and Governor General of Finland, Count Per Brahe the Younger, it is one of 10 remaining historic wooden towns (or town centres) in Finland. Examples of other historic wooden towns in Finland are Kaskinen (Kaskö), Old Rauma, Porvoo (Borgå), Jakobstad (Pietarsaari) and Vaasa (Vasa). After a devastating fire in 1810, Raahe was rebuilt according to new design principles that minimised the risk of fire and enlarged some of the civic spaces. Old Raahe (or "Wooden Raahe") is notable for its Renaissance-inspired rectilinear town plan with an unusual central square (called Pekkatori) with closed corners.

Raahe is located 75 kilometres (47 mi) southwest of Oulu and 126 kilometres (78 mi) northeast of Kokkola, and covers an area of 1,889.00 square kilometres (729.35 sq mi) of which 870.77 km^{2} (336.21 sq mi) is water. The population density is 23.09/km^{2} (59.8/sq mi).. Historically an agricultural and maritime region, Ostrobothnia supplied the largest number of immigrants from Finland to the USA and other countries such as Canada and Australia during the Great Migration of the late 19th and early 20th centuries.

The neighbouring municipalities of Raahe are Haapavesi, Oulainen, Pyhäjoki, Siikajoki and Siikalatva. Founded as a Swedish- and Finnish-speaking town, the municipality is now unilingually Finnish.

Three parishes have been merged with Raahe: Saloinen in 1973, Pattijoki in 2003 and Vihanti in 2013.

The asteroid 1786 Raahe was named after the town and the municipality.

== History ==
=== Before the establishment ===
The area of Raahe was originally a part of the parish of Saloinen, known until 1913 as Salo. It was one of the first parishes in northern Ostrobothnia.

=== Seventeenth-century history ===
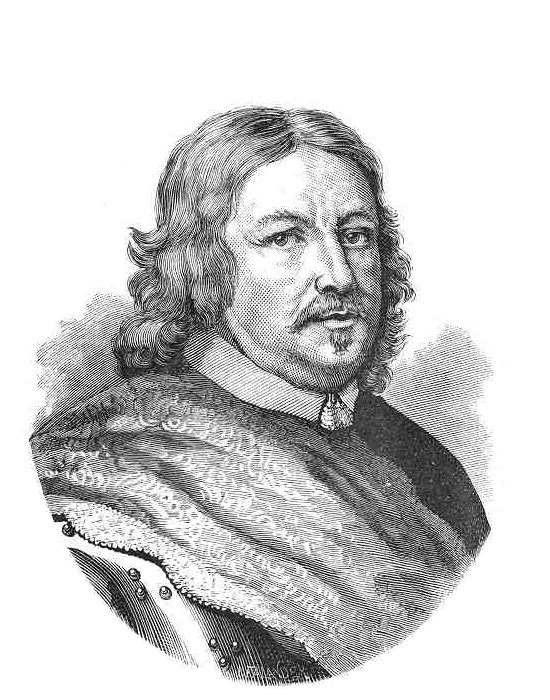
Per Brahe the Younger established the city of Raahe in 1649.

Count Per Brahe the Younger, the governor-general of Finland, gave a charter to the town of Salo (not to be confused with Salo in Finland Proper) in the year of 1649 with the purpose of constructing a town at Satamakangas, near the old harbour site. However, the harbour area had become so low that the future town was decided to be transferred. A new and better location was found further to the north, at the bay of Raahe. Having acquired the possession of the parish of Salo in 1652, Per Brahe renamed the town Brahestad or Raahe in Finnish.

The planning of the town for the purpose of building Raahe was given to the surveyor Claes Claesson. His town plan followed the ideals of the regular grid plan of the Renaissance. All of the streets of Raahe were of equal width of 20-21 cubits or 10–11 meters. The market square stood by Rantakatu and the Town Hall behind the square. At the northeast corner of the town stood the church and the schoolhouse. Six blocks were realized of the town plan, i.e. the area surrounded by present-day Koulukatu, Kirkkokatu, Saaristokatu and Rantakatu. The later expansion and changes of the town have held the ambitions of Claesson's town plan in respect until the beginning of the latest century.

The oldest picture still remaining of the town of Raahe, a seventeenth-century drawing, dates back to the year of 1659. It depicts the town as being surrounded by a so-called customs fence with two custom gates, the eastern one located outside of the crossroads of present-day Brahenkatu and Reiponkatu streets and the southern one at the end of Pitkäkatu street (present-day Kauppakatu street) approximately by present-day Koulukatu street. The busy harbour of the town was located on the shore by the customs warehouse, the present museum.

There were two public buildings in Raahe: a handsome, admirable, two-story town hall with a tower, and a wooden church, whose construction had already begun in 1651. The church was given a weather boarding already in 1684-1685. This is one of the earliest examples of boarding known in Finland.

The dwellings and houses were made from logs. As a rule, they were built close to the street facing plot boundary, the long side and the ridge of the roof parallel to the street. The unbuilt portion of the plot against the street was fitted up with a high, solid plank fence and a drive-in gate. The plots inside a block were not separated by fences. The average house usually consisted of one or two rooms, most of which were of the two-room cabin type. Almost every house in the drawing of Raahe has the most remarkable novelty of the seventeenth century, the chimney. At the same time it was still quite common to have whole towns and villages with chimneyless houses, especially in Eastern Finland. Considered from the point of view of architectural history, at the time of its foundation Raahe was a quite modern town. As far as is known today, no buildings exist from the seventeenth century.

=== 18th century ===
The Great Northern War, fought in the first two decades of the 18th century, and the Great Wrath nearly destroyed the town. In 1705, the population had been 641, while after the war this had decreased to 134, and the majority of the merchant class had escaped the war to Sweden. The town slowly recovered after the war, and trading started again. Raahe was given the right to international trade in 1791, which further enlivened the town's traffic and commerce. Goods such as tar, boards, tallow, butter, and fur were traded through Raahe, and improved road connections increased the competitiveness of the harbour.

== Climate ==
Climate data for Raahe Lapaluoto satama (1991-2020 normals, records 1993-present)
Month	Jan	Feb	Mar	Apr	May	Jun	Jul	Aug	Sep	Oct	Nov	Dec	Year
Record high °C (°F)	5.0 (41.0)	6.3 (43.3)	11.9 (53.4)	20.7 (69.3)	28.6 (83.5)	31.7 (89.1)	33.5 (92.3)	30.5 (86.9)	24.5 (76.1)	18.5 (65.3)	10.5 (50.9)	7.4 (45.3)	33.5 (92.3)
Mean maximum °C (°F)	2.9 (37.2)	2.7 (36.9)	5.5 (41.9)	12.9 (55.2)	20.8 (69.4)	24.4 (75.9)	26.8 (80.2)	24.8 (76.6)	19.4 (66.9)	12.5 (54.5)	7.4 (45.3)	4.4 (39.9)	27.8 (82.0)
Mean daily maximum °C (°F)	−3.7 (25.3)	−4.1 (24.6)	−0.8 (30.6)	4.4 (39.9)	10.4 (50.7)	16.0 (60.8)	19.7 (67.5)	18.1 (64.6)	13.2 (55.8)	6.8 (44.2)	1.9 (35.4)	−1.3 (29.7)	6.7 (44.1)
Daily mean °C (°F)	−6.2 (20.8)	−6.8 (19.8)	−3.7 (25.3)	1.1 (34.0)	6.8 (44.2)	12.5 (54.5)	16.2 (61.2)	15.0 (59.0)	10.5 (50.9)	4.5 (40.1)	−0.1 (31.8)	−3.5 (25.7)	3.9 (39.0)
Mean daily minimum °C (°F)	−9.4 (15.1)	−10.1 (13.8)	−7.0 (19.4)	−1.5 (29.3)	3.7 (38.7)	9.6 (49.3)	13.5 (56.3)	12.2 (54.0)	7.9 (46.2)	2.7 (36.9)	−2.0 (28.4)	−6.1 (21.0)	1.1 (34.0)
Mean minimum °C (°F)	−22.1 (−7.8)	−22.1 (−7.8)	−17.6 (0.3)	−8.7 (16.3)	−1.4 (29.5)	4.7 (40.5)	9.0 (48.2)	6.5 (43.7)	1.6 (34.9)	−4.9 (23.2)	−11.0 (12.2)	−18.0 (−0.4)	−25.5 (−13.9)
Record low °C (°F)	−31.4 (−24.5)	−30.1 (−22.2)	−26.9 (−16.4)	−15.7 (3.7)	−4.8 (23.4)	2.0 (35.6)	6.6 (43.9)	4.0 (39.2)	−2.1 (28.2)	−12.4 (9.7)	−20.6 (−5.1)	−34.1 (−29.4)	−34.1 (−29.4)
Average relative humidity (%)	88	87	84	80	77	76	79	81	83	86	89	88	83
Source 1: https://www.ilmatieteenlaitos.fi/ilmastollinen-vertailukausi
Source 2: https://kilotavu.com/asema-taulukko.php?asema=101785

== Economy ==
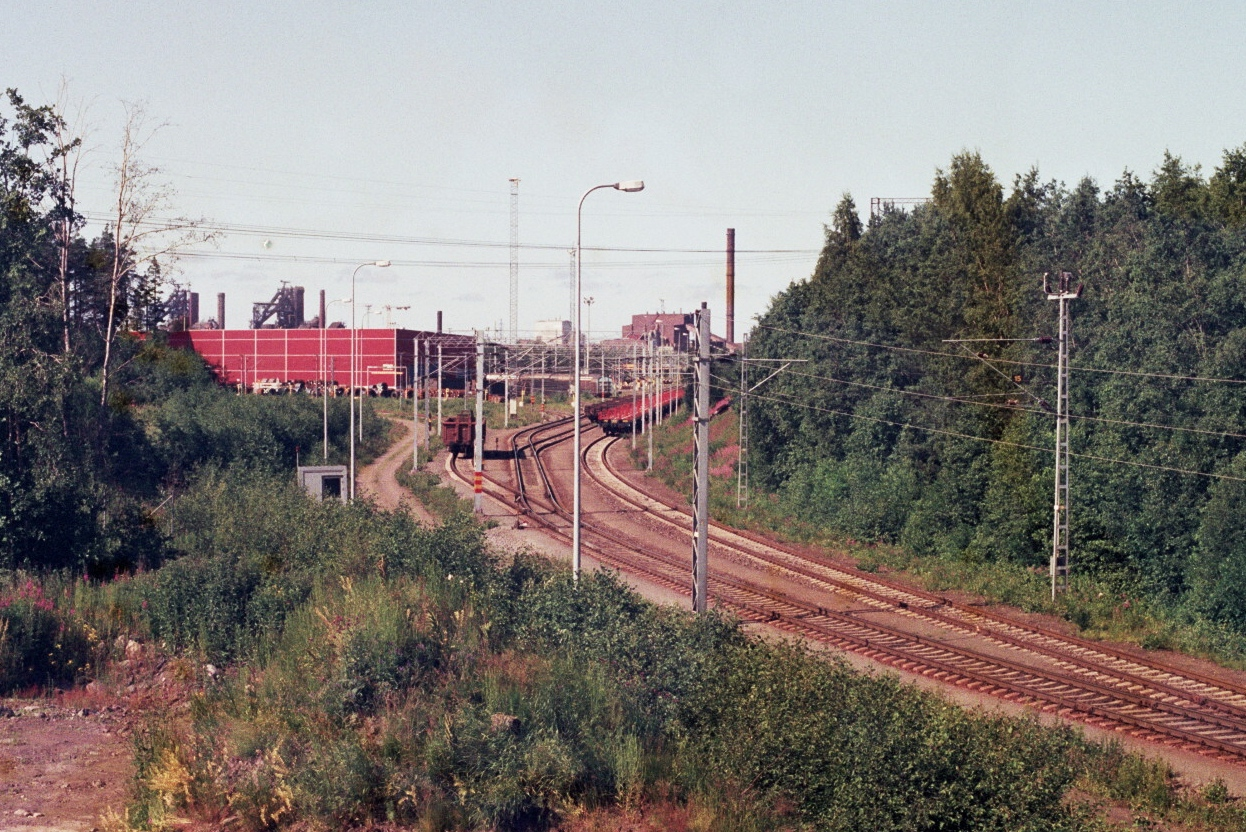
A railway connection to the Rautaruukki steel factory in July 2009

Raahe was granted Staple port rights in 1791 and was traditionally a harbor town. With industrialization, Raahe was reinvented as a steel and heavy industry city and has further developed with engineering services, ICT and software production. Raahe is known for steel, heavy machinery, engineering works, shipping and ICT. The Rautaruukki steel mill, which up to the 1980s was the largest single industrial site in the Nordic countries, is located in Raahe. The mill produces steel plate, coil and sheeting and semi-finished products for the engineering works.

Traditionally, Raahe was a port city. In the late Age of Sail, the 1850s and on, shipping companies in Raahe owned Finland's largest fleet of sailing vessels, 60 in total at their height. Currently, the port of Raahe is the sixth busiest port in the country, with 700 ships visiting each year. Cargo that is transported through the port includes raw materials and loose cargo, steel, lumber, containers and contract-shipped goods.

With the steel industry, Raahe has grown into the third largest city in the ex-Oulu province, after Oulu and Kajaani. Like Oulu, the city promotes the ICT business, with the help of the steel industry (ProMetal and Steelpolis) and ICT industry (Softpolis) business incubators/business parks.

The municipal tax rate is 19.75%. In 2007, the structure of the economy was as follows: agriculture and forestry 1%, construction 6%, manufacturing 43%, and retail, services and public services 50%. The sub-region includes the municipalities of Pyhäjoki and Siikajoki.

== Demographics ==
Population size 1990–2025
Year	Population
1990	27,999
1995	27,690
2000	26,766
2005	25,746
2010	25,656
2015	25,165
2020	24,353
2025	23,413

== Sports ==
The men's pesäpallo team Pattijoen Urheilijat competes in the Superpesis national league, playing at Rännäri Stadium.

== Transportation ==
The European route E8 goes through the city, and is the biggest mean of land transportation in Raahe. Raahe also has bus transportation by various companies. The Raahe railway station next to the Raahe Railroad was closed from passenger traffic in 1966. Ticket selling ended in 2000.

== Notable people ==
- Joonas Donskoi (born 1992), ice hockey player
- Katja Hänninen (born 1980), politician
- Jyri Junnila (born 1984), ice hockey player
- Petri Keskitalo (born 1967), decathlete
- Heikki Kinnunen (born 1946), actor
- Laura Kivistö (born 1981), football (soccer) player
- JP Leppäluoto (born 1974), musician
- Hanna-Leena Mattila (born 1964), politician
- Janne Niinimaa (born 1975), ice hockey player
- Lasse Paakkonen (born 1986), cross-country skier
- Markus Poukkula (born 1988), ice hockey player
- Samuli Putro (born 1970), musician
- Miikka Salomäki (born 1993), ice hockey player
- Onni Suutari (born 2003), football player

== International relations ==
=== Twin towns – sister cities ===
Raahe is twinned with:

- Skellefteå, Sweden, since 1940
- Mo i Rana, Norway, since 1946
- Cherepovets, Russia, since 1968, cooperation suspended since 2022
- Košice, Slovakia, since 1987
- Märjamaa, Estonia, twinned with Vihanti (now consolidated with Raahe) since 1998
- Sosnovy Bor, Russia, since 2017, cooperation suspended since 2022
- Aiud, Romania, preparation for twinning agreement started in 2018

== Gallery ==
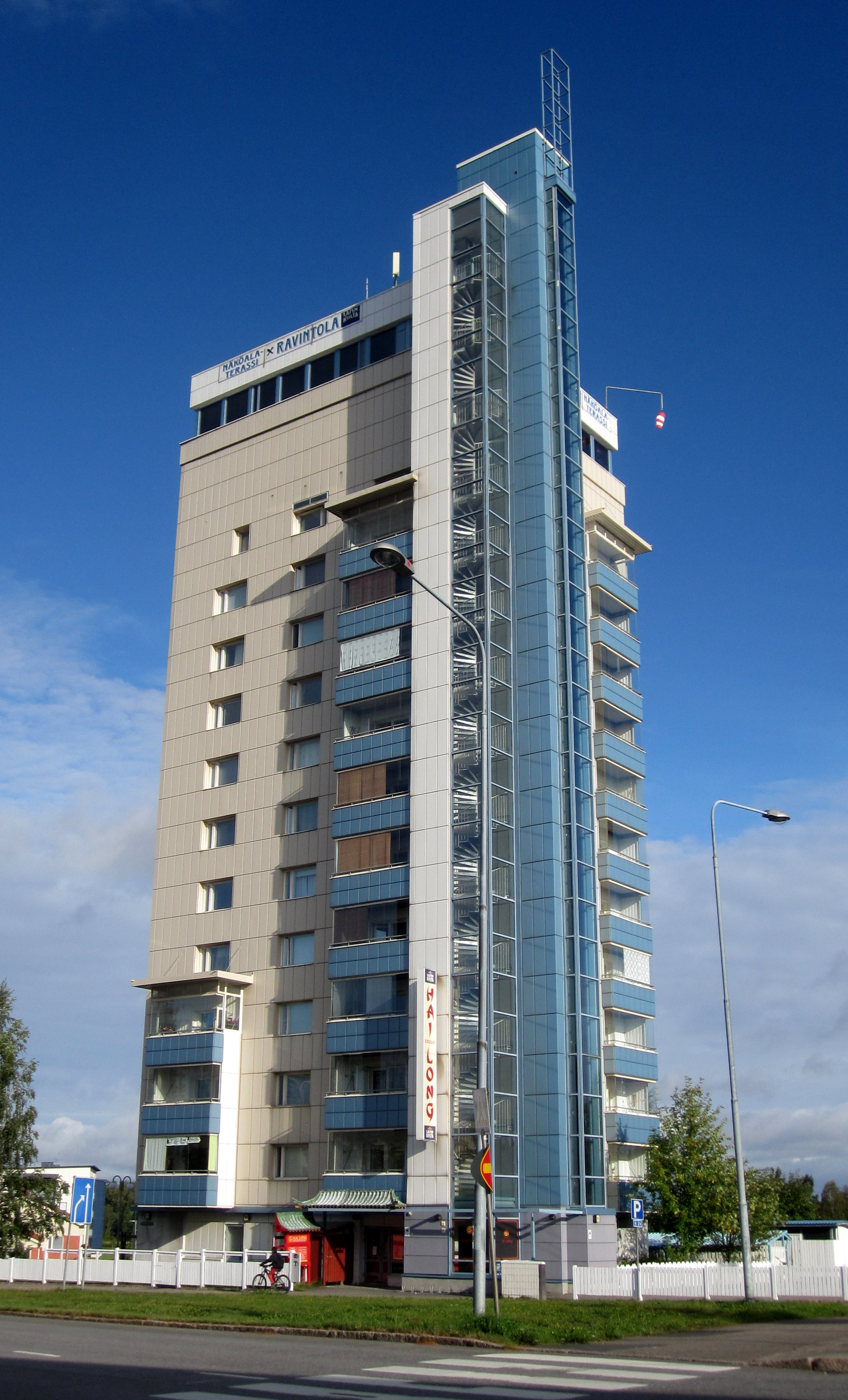
Raahe highrise/water tower was built in 1958.

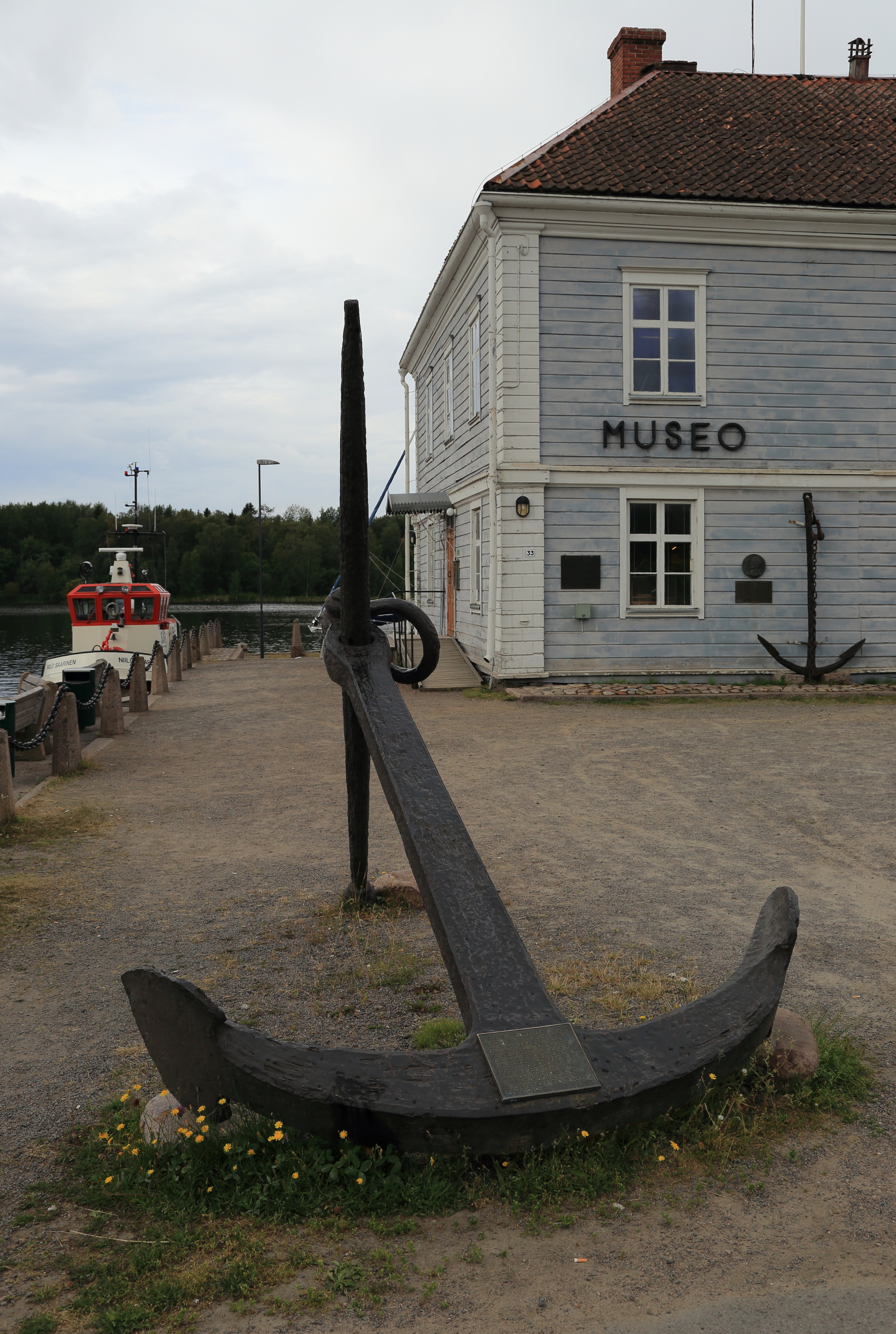
Raahe Museum

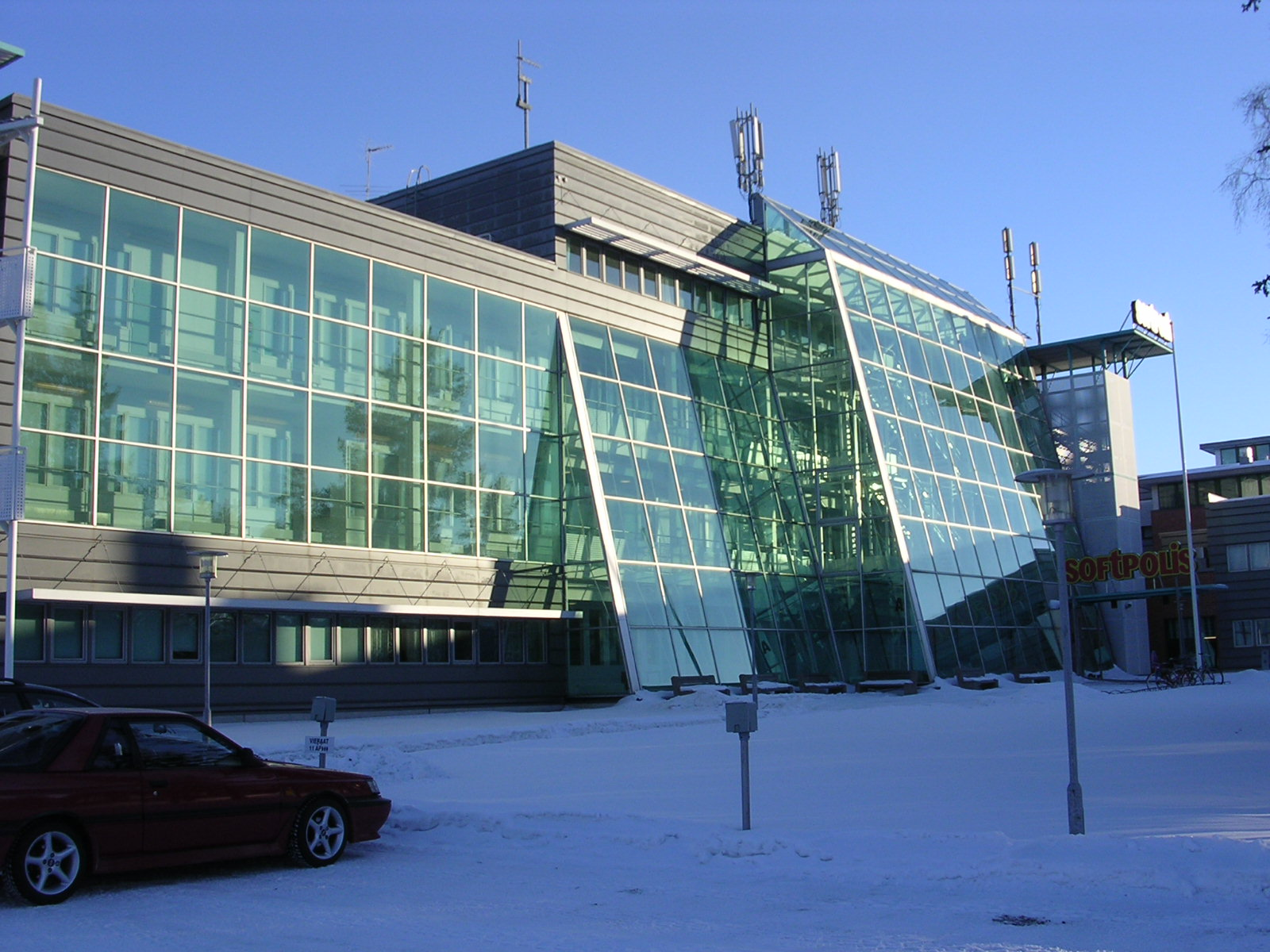
Softpolis Raahe

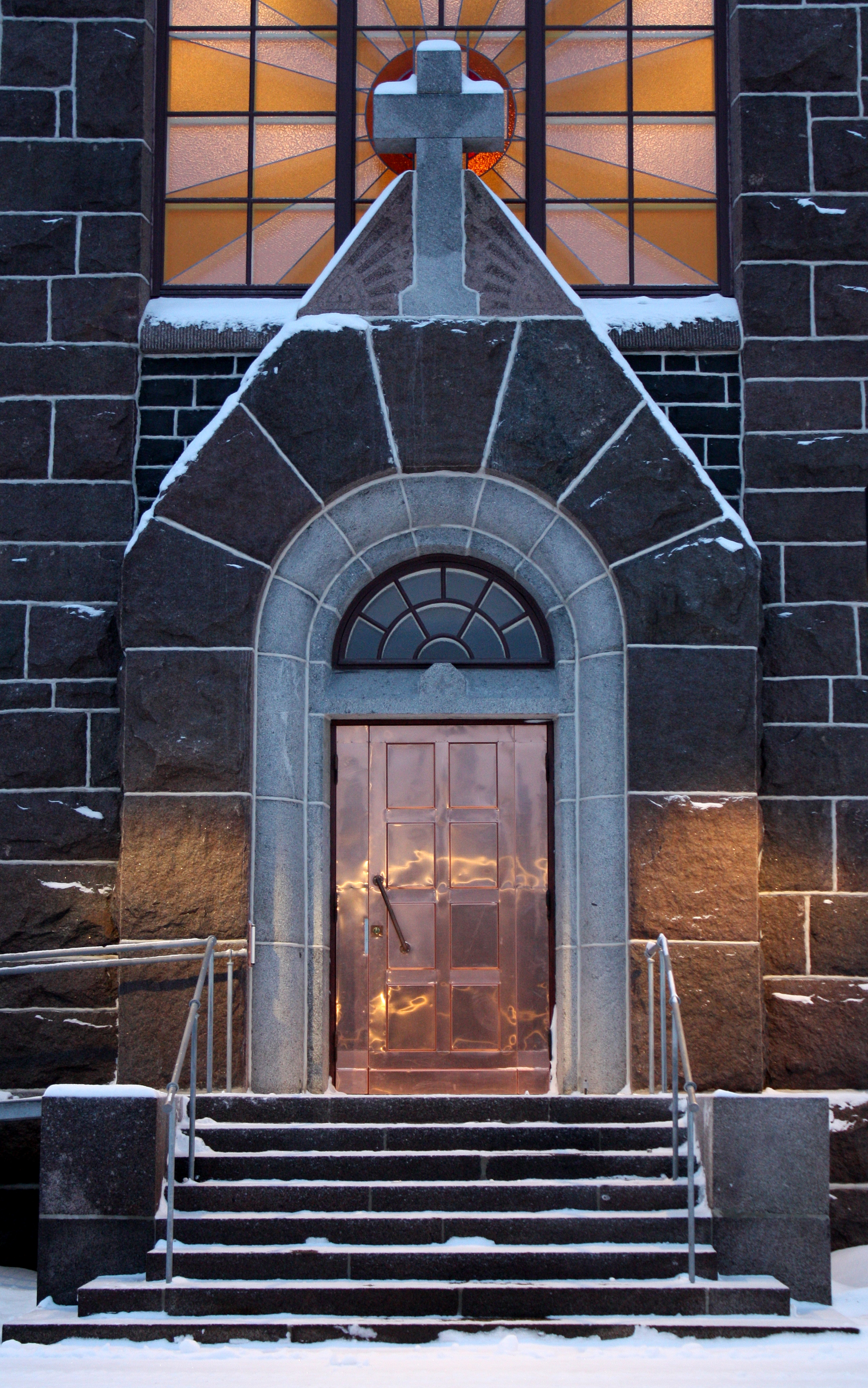
Raahe Church

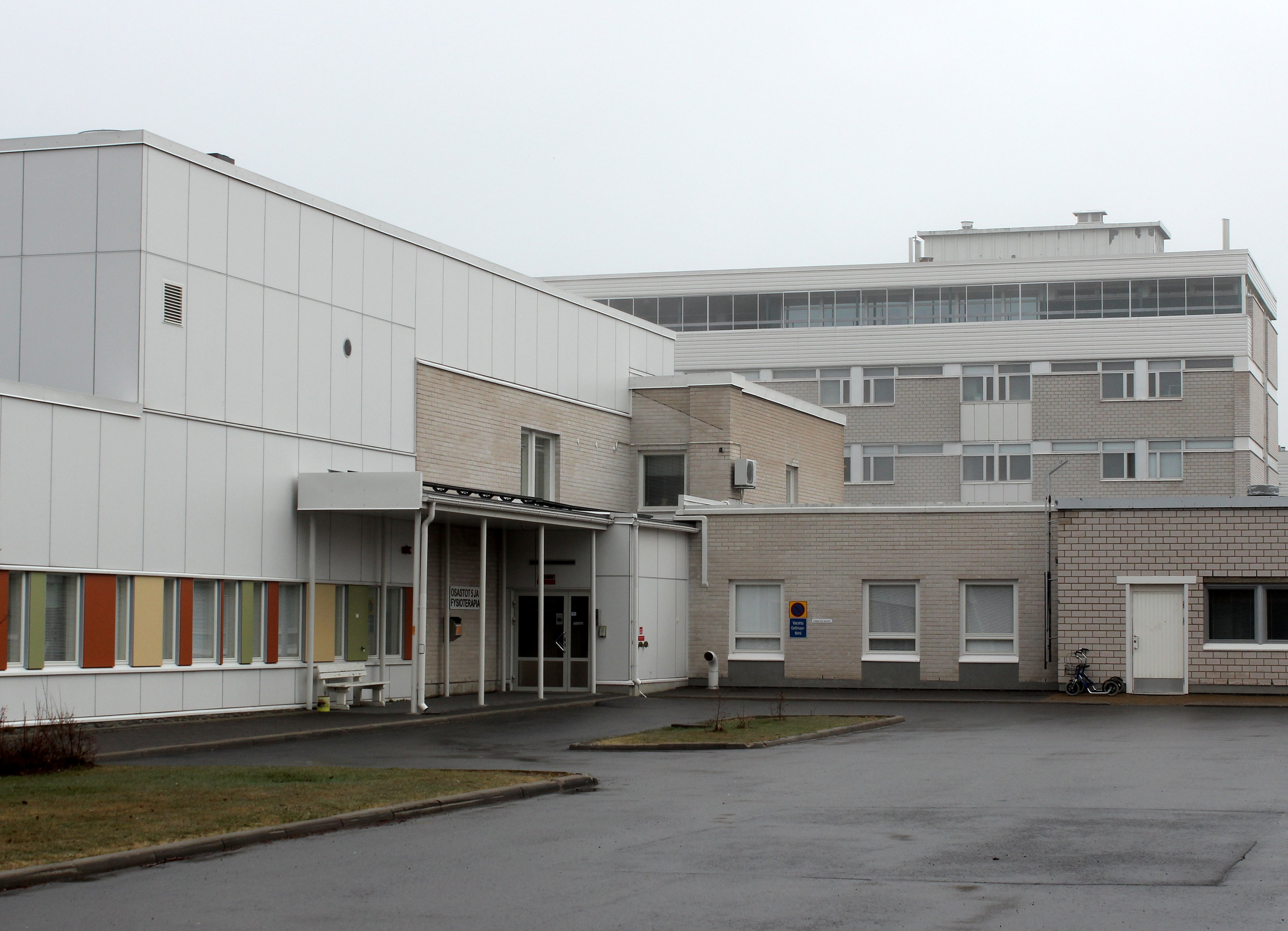
The Raahe Hospital

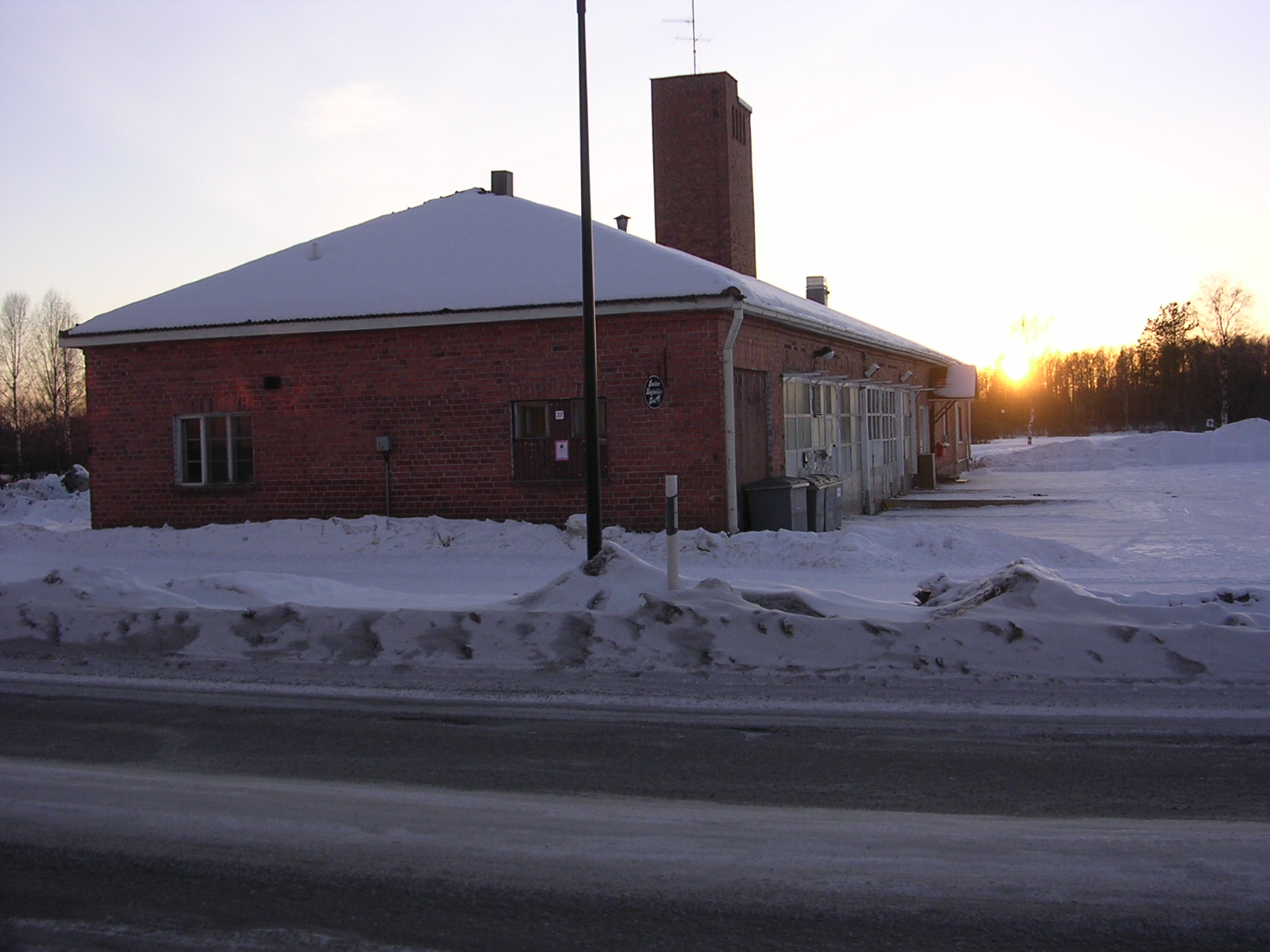
Animal shelter for found animals

== See also ==
- Raahe Museum
- Tasku beacon tower
