= Fishing industry in Wales =

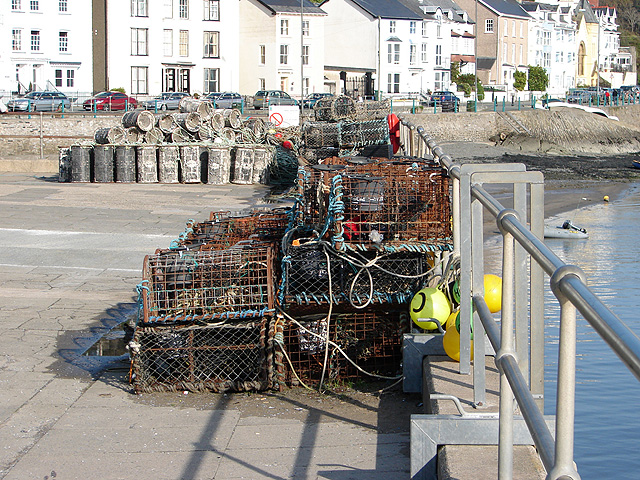
Lobster traps at Aberdyfi

The fishing industry in Wales is a sector of the Welsh economy.

== History ==
Fishermen in Monmouthshire have fished using lave nets in the Severn Estuary since the 17th century.

Fishing is not one of Wales' main industries, but the country has a number of small fishing ports, as well as the main port of Milford Haven, with hundreds of fishing boats. The main catches are scallops, cod, lobster, and skate.

=== Tridents ===
Traditionally three-pointed spears were used while standing or swimming. This is some local history by Celt Roberts of Talsarnau, where the tradition was practised until recently:

"Evan Jones (1859–1928) was noted for catching plaice on the shore. He used to swim with one arm while holding a trident in the other, and often obtained a good catch. His grandson Derwyn Evans worked for some years in the 1950s on Talsarnau beach cutting turf and travelling far to make lawns for bowling and tennis, and to such places as the plantation for Wembley. His equipment was handed over and used for Talsarnau Community Hall."

== Overview ==
Commercial fishing in Wales employs approximately 600 people full-time and was valued at £39 million in 2021. 92% of Welsh fishing vessels are designated small-scale. (Note: Small-scale vessels are ships with a length under 10 metres.)
