= List of ports and harbours in Wales =

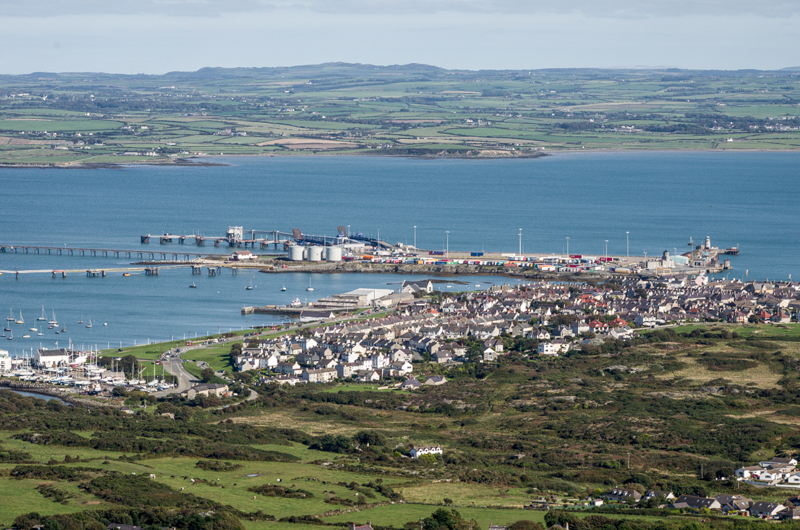
Port of Holyhead

This article lists the ports and harbours present in Wales. Ports form an essential and important resource for the economy of Wales and are involved in the movement of freight and people and allow for international trade links.

== by region ==
* member of The Welsh Ports Group The following list is arranged anti-clockwise from the Welsh-English border in the north-east to the border again in the south-east.

=== North East ===
- Shotton
- Mostyn*

=== North West ===
- Llandulas
- Conwy harbour*
- Deganwy
- Port Penrhyn
- Menai Bridge
- Beaumaris
- Amlwch Harbour
- Anglesey*
- Port of Holyhead*
- Caernarfon
- Aberdyfi

=== Mid ===
- Aberystwyth

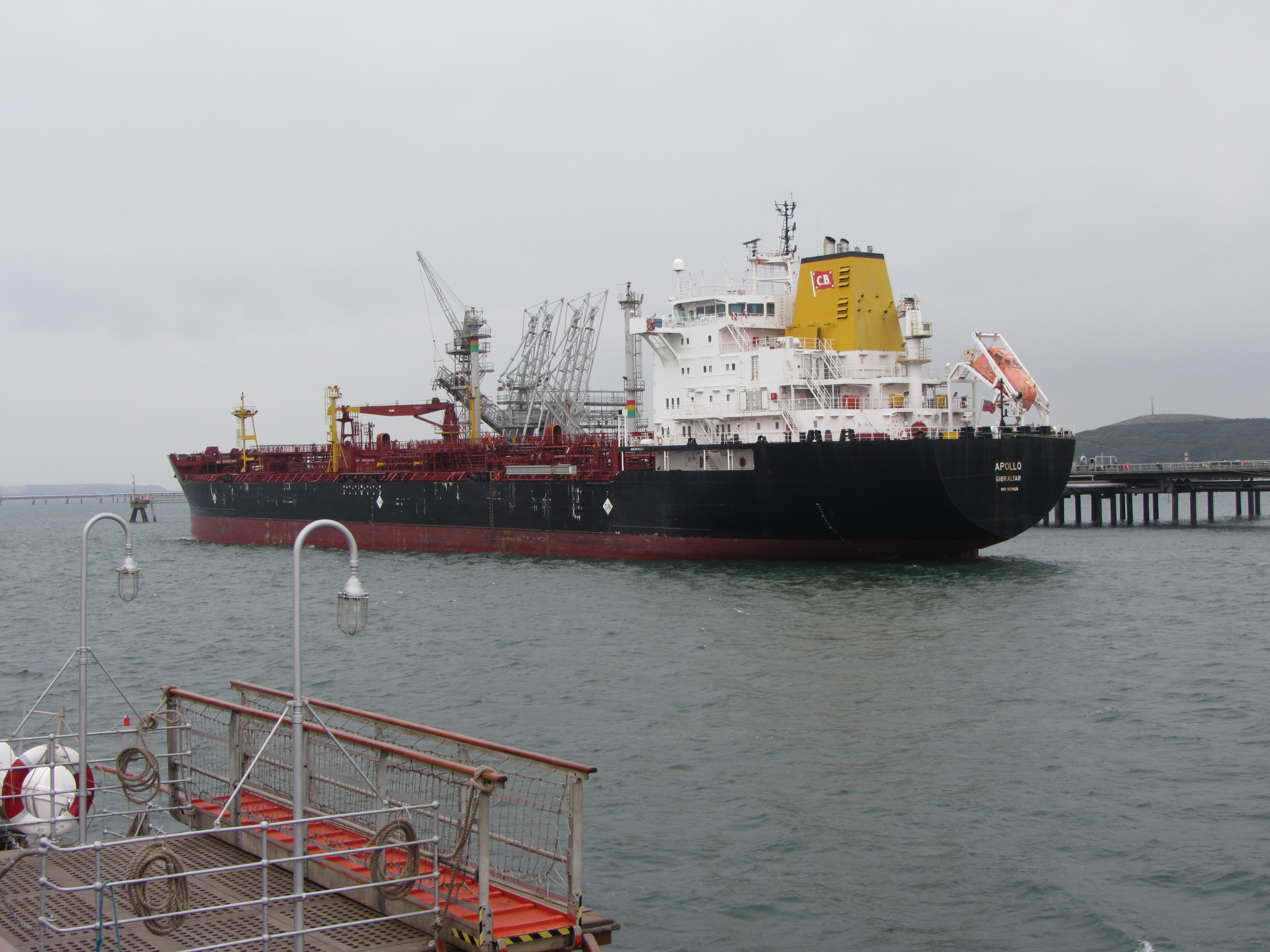
Milford Haven

- Cardigan

=== West ===
- Fishguard Harbour*
- Milford Haven Port* - The third largest port in the UK and a strategic energy hub
- Pembroke Port
- Saundersfoot Harbour*
- Burry Port harbour
- Llanelli

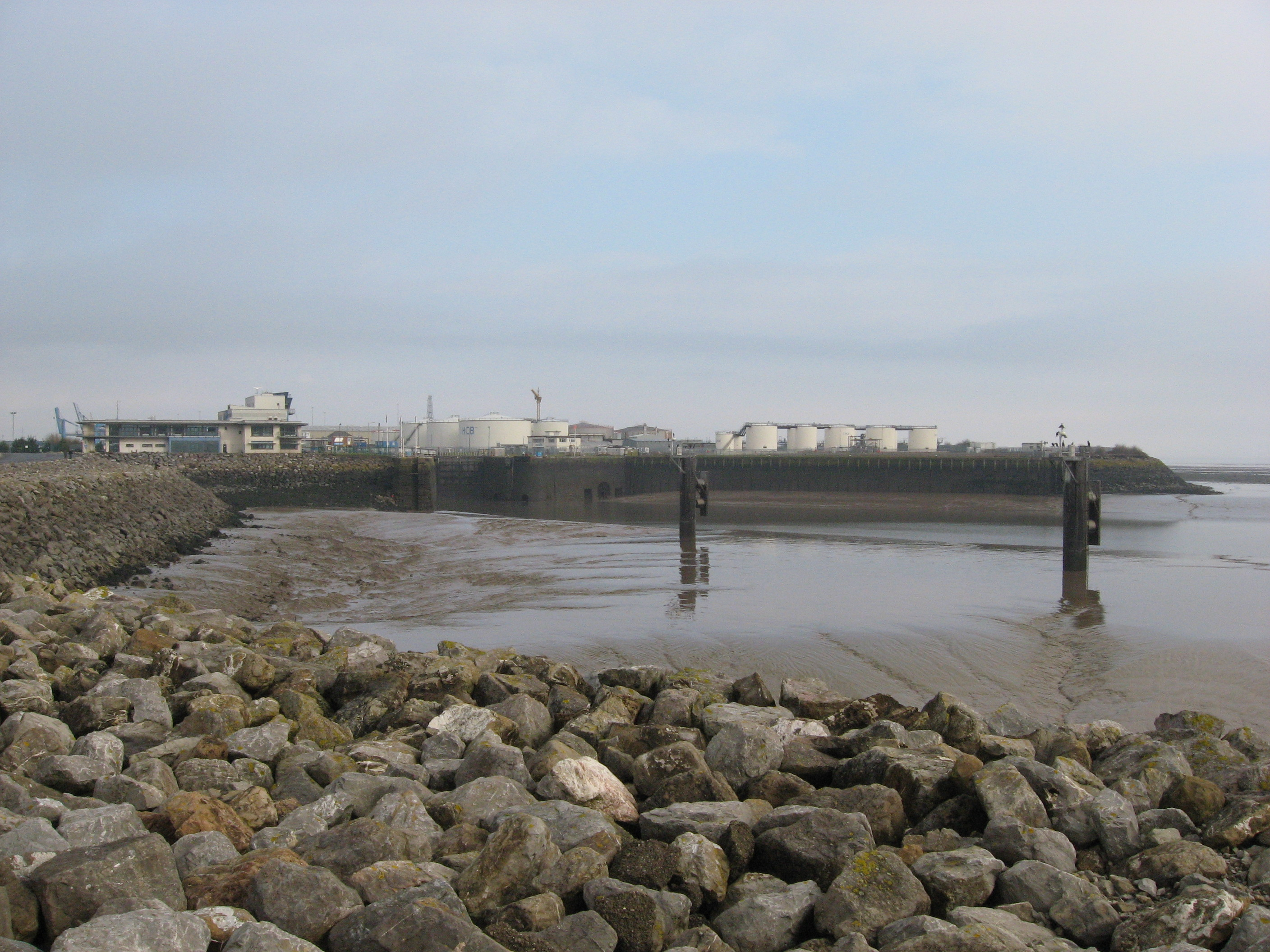
Cardiff port entrance at low tide

=== South ===
- Swansea docks*
- Neath*
- Port of Port Talbot*
- Barry Docks*
- Cardiff Docks*
- Newport Docks*

== Prospective free ports ==
The following have been approved as free ports in Wales:

- Celtic Freeport, at Milford Haven and Port Talbot
- Anglesey Freeport

== See also ==
- Transport in Wales
- Fishing industry in Wales
