= Old Co-Operative Grain Store =

Building in Scotland

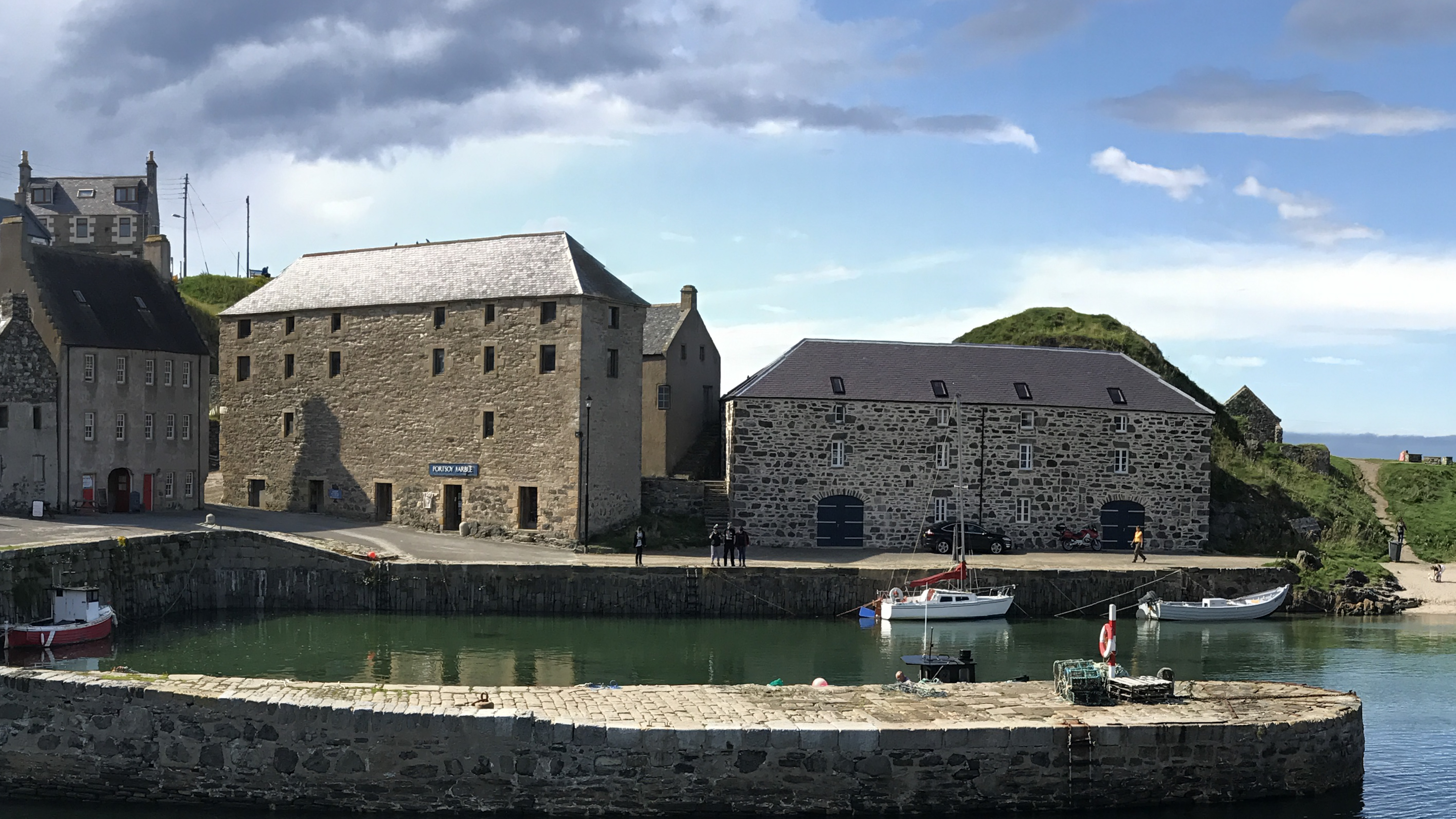
- The building (right) in 2017
- Location: Shorehead, Portsoy, Aberdeenshire, Scotland
- Coordinates: 57.6852564°N 2.691507°W
- Built: late 18th century

Listed Building – Category B
- Official name: Shorehead, Old Co-Operative Grain Store
- Designated: 22 February 1972
- Reference no.: LB40295

The Old Co-Operative Grain Store (also known as The Granary) is a Category B listed building in Portsoy, Aberdeenshire, Scotland. Dating to the late 18th century, it stands in Shorehead, on the western side of Portsoy harbour. The harbour itself is Category A listed, dating to 1692.

The building has a forestair leading to a first-floor entrance in the southern gable. It also has a corrugated asbestos roof featuring ventilators on its ridge. Historic Scotland assessed the building in a group containing 10 Shorehead, the adjacent Corf Warehouse and the harbour.

The grain store was one of six buildings in the harbour owned by Tom Burnett-Stuart. When he died, in January 2020, he left the buildings in the care of North East Scotland Preservation Trust (NESPT). The building's façade was remodelled in 2018.

The building doubled as the home of Clement Freres Whisky warehouse in the television series Peaky Blinders.

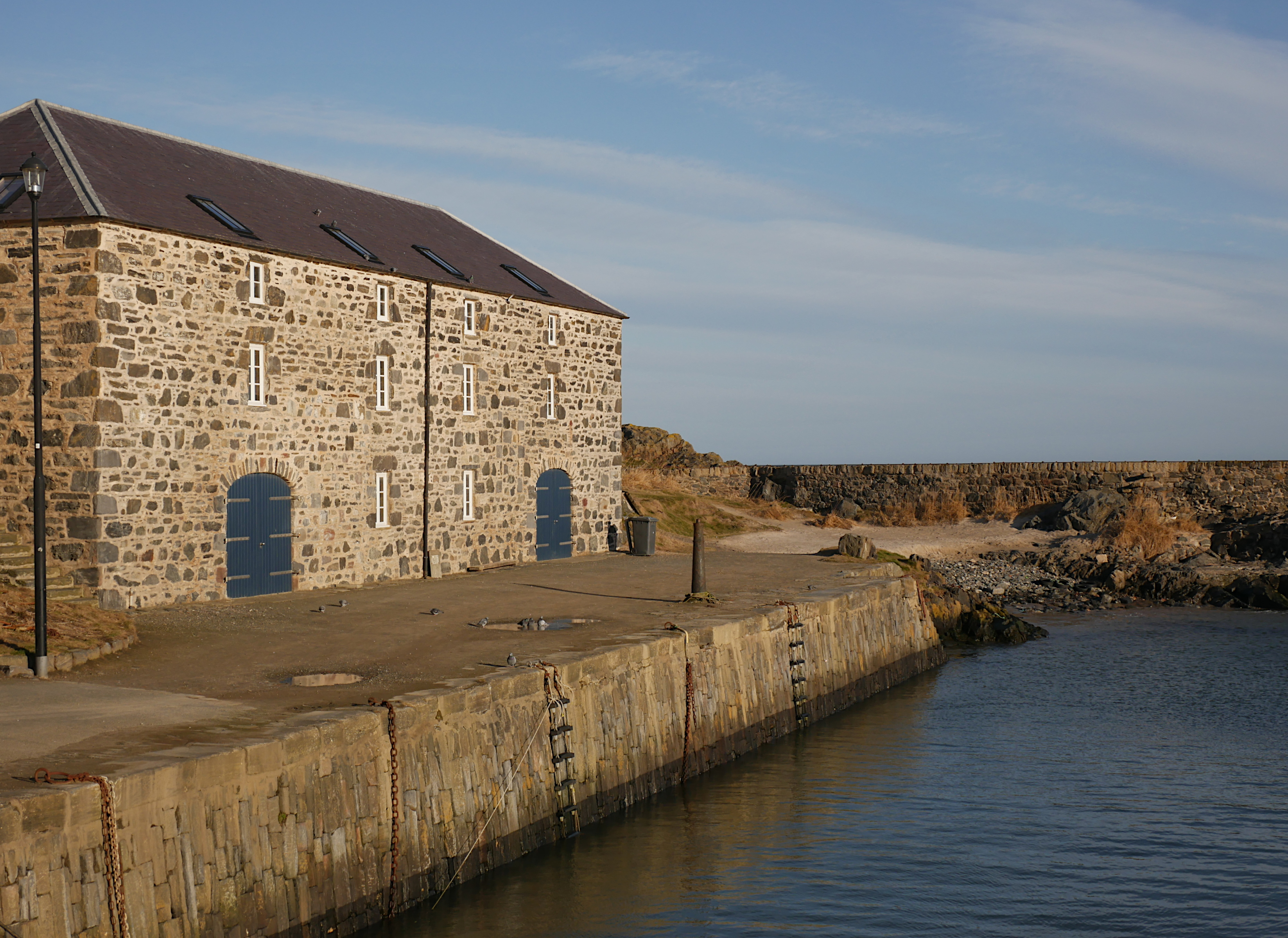
A closer view of the building

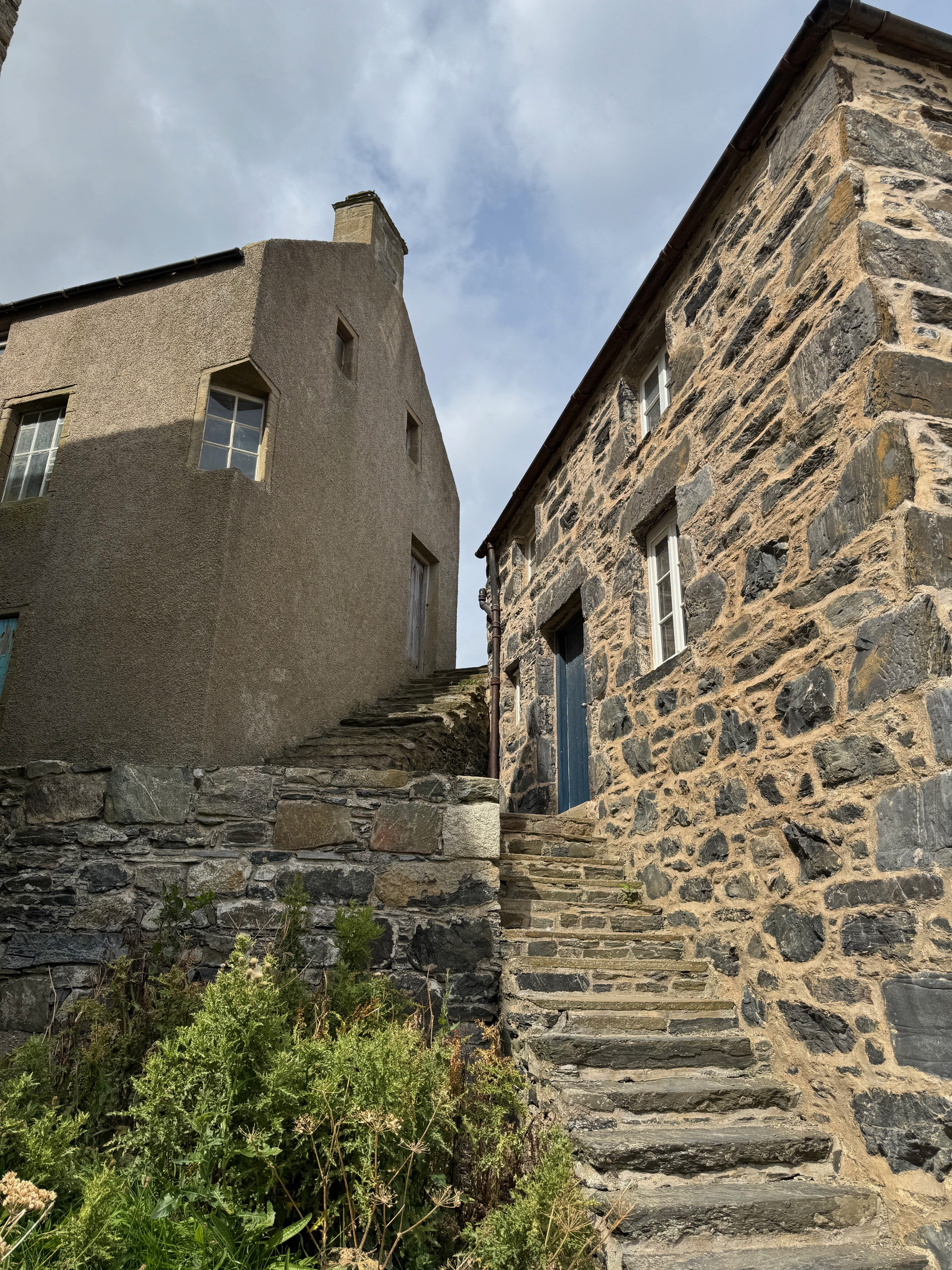
The building's forestair, pictured in 2024

== See also ==
- List of listed buildings in Portsoy, Aberdeenshire
