= 9 Shorehead =

Building in Scotland

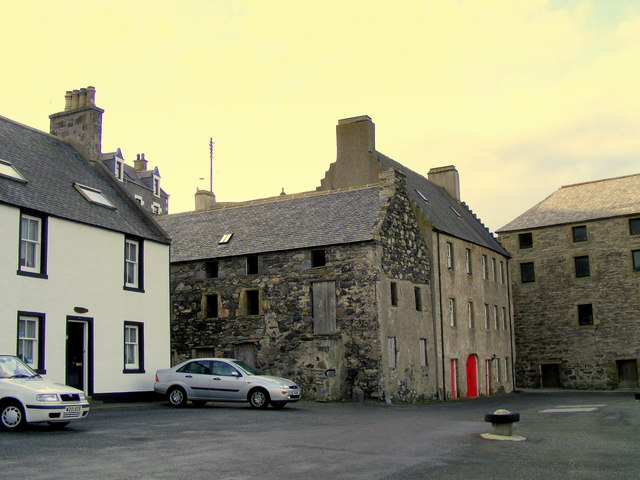
- The building (left) in 2008
- Location: Shorehead, Portsoy, Aberdeenshire, Scotland
- Coordinates: 57°41′05″N 2°41′29″W
- Built: c. 1800

Listed Building – Category B
- Official name: 9 Shorehead
- Designated: 22 February 1972
- Reference no.: LB40290

9 Shorehead is a Category B listed building in Portsoy, Aberdeenshire, Scotland. Dating to around the turn of the 19th century, it stands in Shorehead, at the southern edge of Portsoy harbour. The harbour itself is Category A listed, dating to 1692.

The building is two storeys with a dormerless attic. It has three bays, with its door slightly left of centre. As of 2025, it is a home named "Pittodrie".

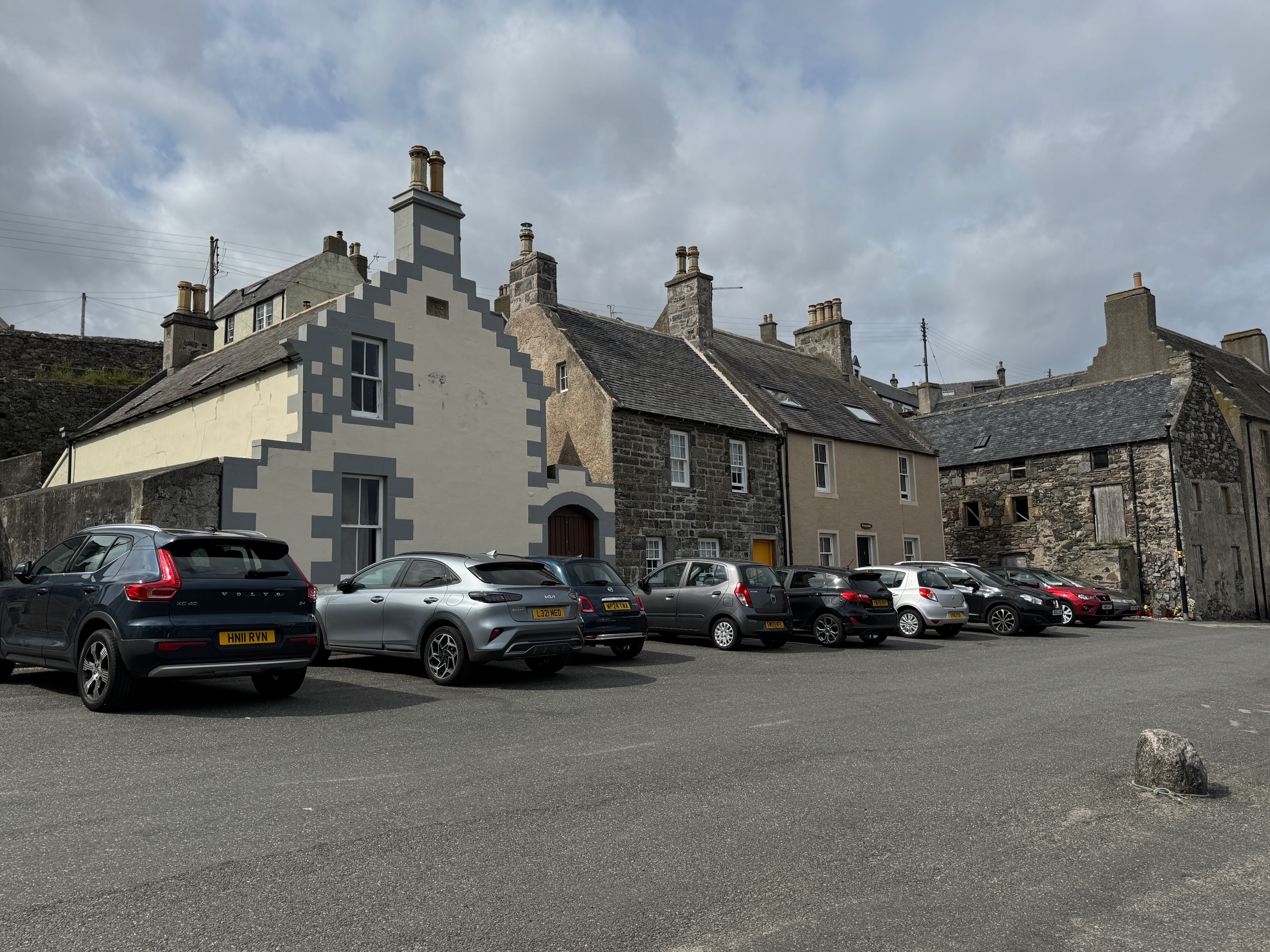
Pictured in its structural grouping overlooking the harbour. 6 and 7 Shorehead is to its left; 10 Shorehead to the right

== See also ==
- List of listed buildings in Portsoy, Aberdeenshire
