= 3 Church Street, Portsoy =

Building in Portsoy, Scotland

3 Church Street
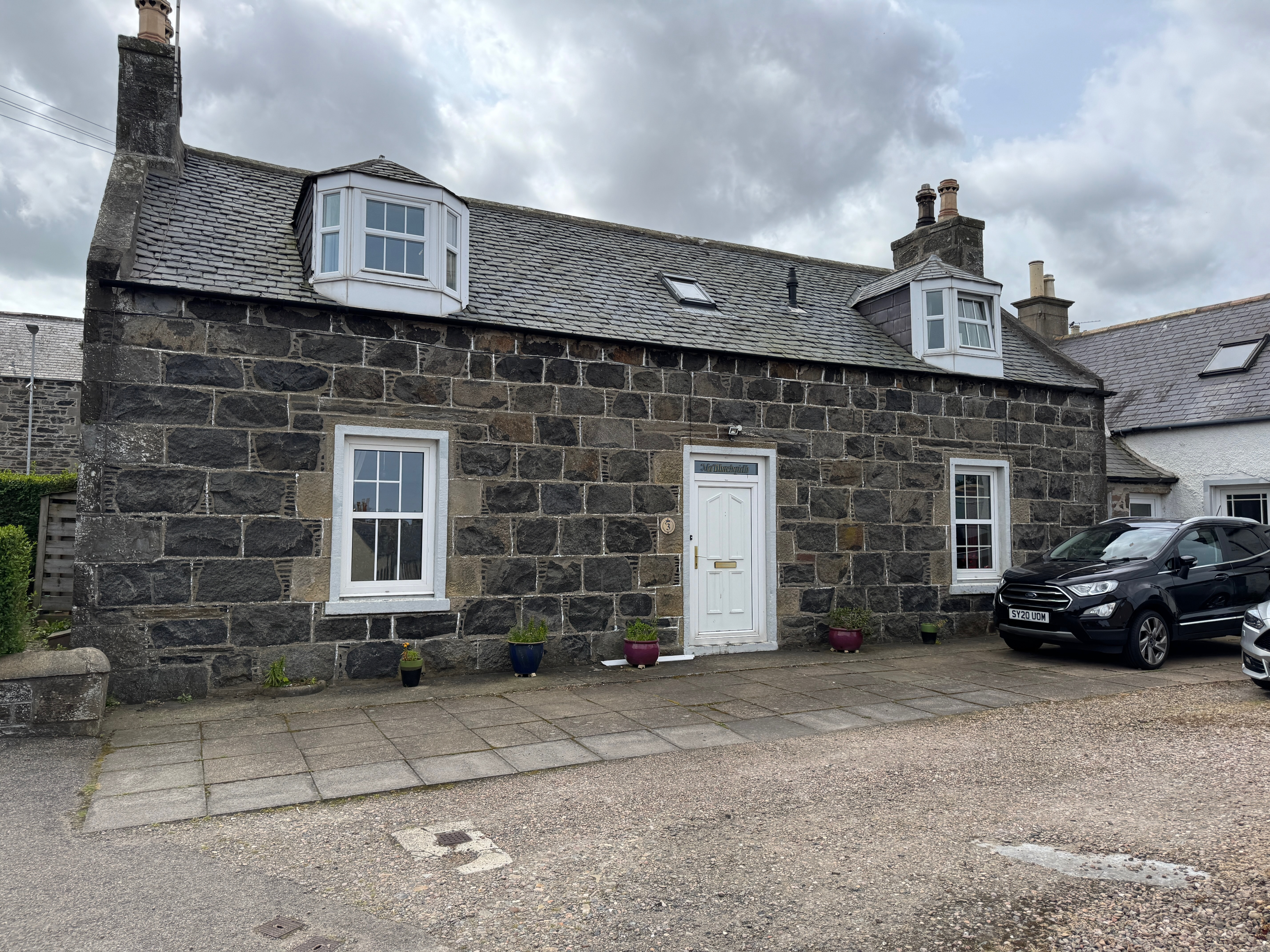
- The building in 2024

- Shown in Aberdeenshire 3 Church Street, Portsoy (Scotland)
- 57.681689°N 2.688185°W
- Location: 3 Church Street, Portsoy

History
- Built: c. 1800 (226 years ago)

Listed Building – Category C(S)
- Official name: 3 Church Street
- Designated: 22 February 1972
- Reference no.: LB40219

3 Church Street is a building in Portsoy, Aberdeenshire, Scotland. Dating to around 1800, it is a Category C listed building.

The building is a single-storey home with an attic. It is three bays wide and has a squared rubble frontage and eastern gable, which faces Church Street. The rear of the property is rendered rubble. Its centred front door was formerly panelled with a letterbox fanlight and painted jambs. As of 2024, however, it has been replaced with a PVC door. It has a slate roof with coped end chimney stacks. There is a small, single-storey two-bay wing at the western gable.

== See also ==
- List of listed buildings in Portsoy, Aberdeenshire
