= The Square, Portsoy =

Open space in Portsoy, Scotland

The Square
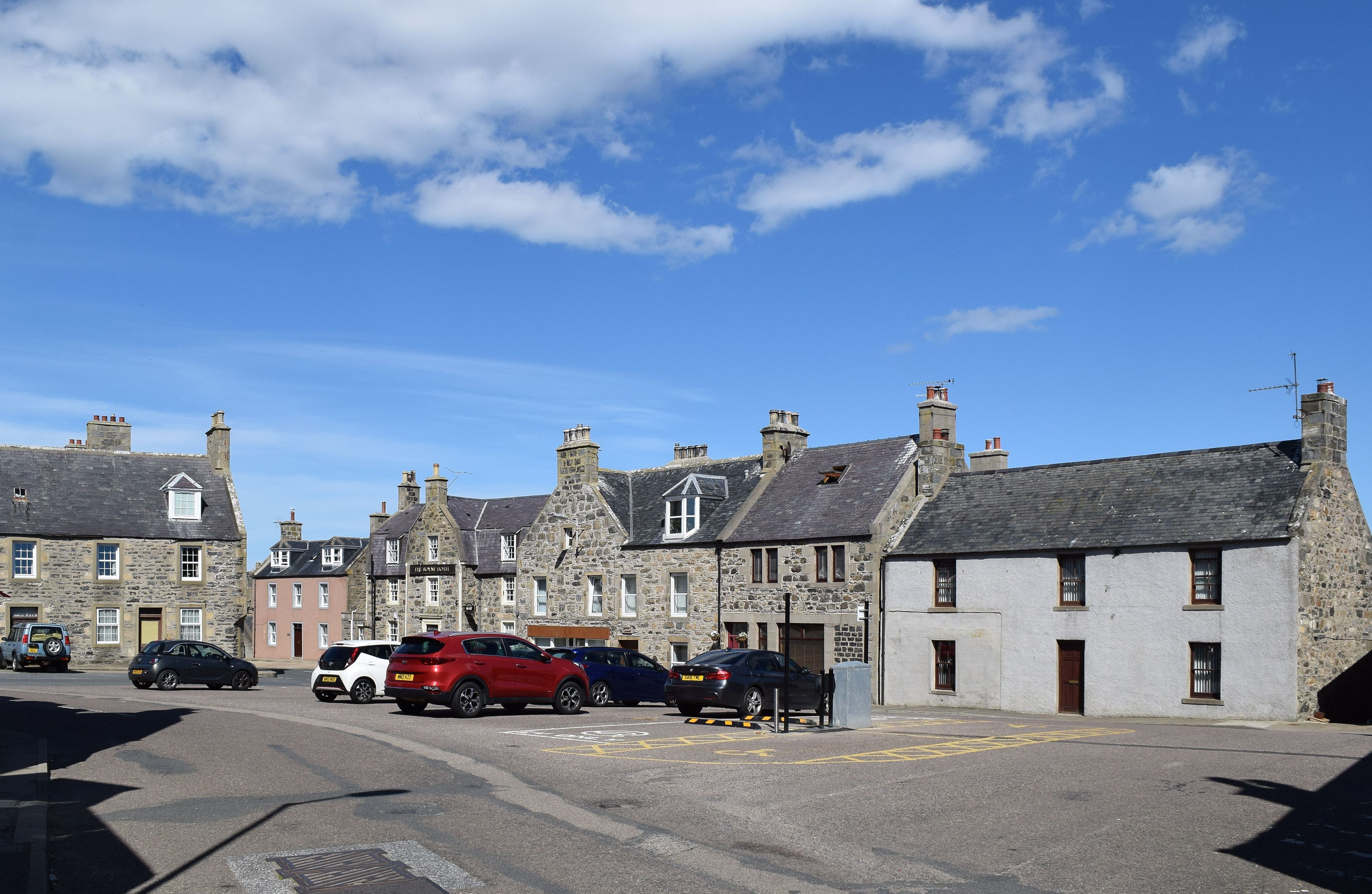
- A 2022 view, looking north
- Location: Portsoy, Aberdeenshire, Scotland
- Coordinates: 57.683183°N 2.6914927°W
- North: North High Street
- East: Culbert Street
- South: South High Street
- West: Cullen Street

The Square an open space in Portsoy, Aberdeenshire, Scotland. It stands at the convergence of North High Street to the north, Culbert Street to the east, South High Street to the south and Cullen Street to the west.

Portsoy's Old Town Hall stands on the northern side of the square. A Category C listed building, it was built in 1798. 26 The Square, also Category C listed, was built around the same time. Built in the early 19th century, 18 and 19 The Square are also Category C listed.
