= List of ports and harbours in Scotland =

This is a list of ports and harbours in Scotland based on Department for Transport data.

| Name | Place | Council area | Port type | Ferry service | Notes |
|---|---|---|---|---|---|
| Port of Aberdeen | Aberdeen | Aberdeen | Oil, Commercial, Cruise, Cargo, Renewables and Ferry | Yes | Largest and busiest port in Scotland |
| Ardossan Harbour | Ardrossan | North Ayrshire | Commercial | Yes | |
| Sullom Voe Terminal | Sullom Voe | Shetland | Oil | No | Accepts largest vessels in world |
| Lerwick Harbour | Lerwick | Shetland | Commercial, fishing, cruise | Yes | |
| Scalloway Harbour | Scalloway | Shetland | Fishing | No | |
| Cairnryan Harbour | Cairnryan | Dumfries and Galloway | Ferry Terminal, Commercial | Yes | |
| Cromarty Firth | Invergordon | Highland | Panamax, naval base | No | |
| Finnart Oil Terminal | Loch Long | Argyll and Bute | Oil Terminal | No | |
| Grangemouth Port | Grangemouth | Falkirk | Commercial, container terminal | No | Scotland's largest container terminal. |
| Hound Point | Firth of Forth | Fife | Panamax, oil terminal | No | - |
| Hunterston Terminal | Fairlie, North Ayrshire | North Ayrshire | Commercial, coal-handling port | No | - |
| Flotta Harbour | Flotta | Orkney | Oil, Ferry Terminal | Yes | |
| Kirkwall Harbour and others in the islands | Kirkwall, Stromness, Scapa Flow | Orkney | Ferry Terminal, Fishing, cruise | Yes | |
| Port of Leith | Leith | Edinburgh | Commercial | No | - |
| Ullapool Harbour | Ullapool | Highland | Ferry terminal, fishing port, commercial | Yes | |
| Rosyth Dockyard | Rosyth | Fife | Commercial, naval dockyard | No | - |
| Fraserburgh Harbour | Fraserburgh | Aberdeenshire | Commercial, Fishing, Cargo | No | |
| Dundee Harbour | Dundee | Dundee City | Commercial | No | |
| Glensanda harbour | Glensanda | Highland | Quarry | No | |
| Peterhead Harbour | Peterhead | Aberdeenshire | Fishing, offshore services, commercial | No | |
| Port of Ayr | Ayr | South Ayrshire | Commercial, cruise | No | |
| Port of Ardrishaig | Ardrishaig | Argyll and Bute | Timber | No | |
| Buckie harbour | Buckie | Moray | Fishing, offshore services | No | |
| Corpach harbour | Corpach | Highland | aluminium | No | |
| Inverkeithing harbour | Inverkeithing, Firth of Forth | Fife | | No | |
| Port of Inverness | Inverness | Highland | Commercial | No | |
| Montrose harbour | Montrose | Angus | Offshore services | No | |
| Scrabster harbour | Scrabster | Highland | Ferry, fishing | Yes | |
| Stornoway harbour | Stornoway | na h-Eilean Siar | Ferry, fishing | Yes | |
| Troon harbour | Troon | South Ayrshire | Timber | No | |
| Wick harbour | Wick | Highland | Offshore services, fishing | No | - |
| Portsoy harbour | Portsoy | Aberdeenshire | | No | |

== See also ==
- List of RNLI stations#Scotland Region
- List of ports and harbours of the Atlantic Ocean#United Kingdom
- List of North Sea ports#United Kingdom
- List of marinas#Scotland
