= Malvern, Portsoy =

Building in Portsoy, Scotland

Malvern
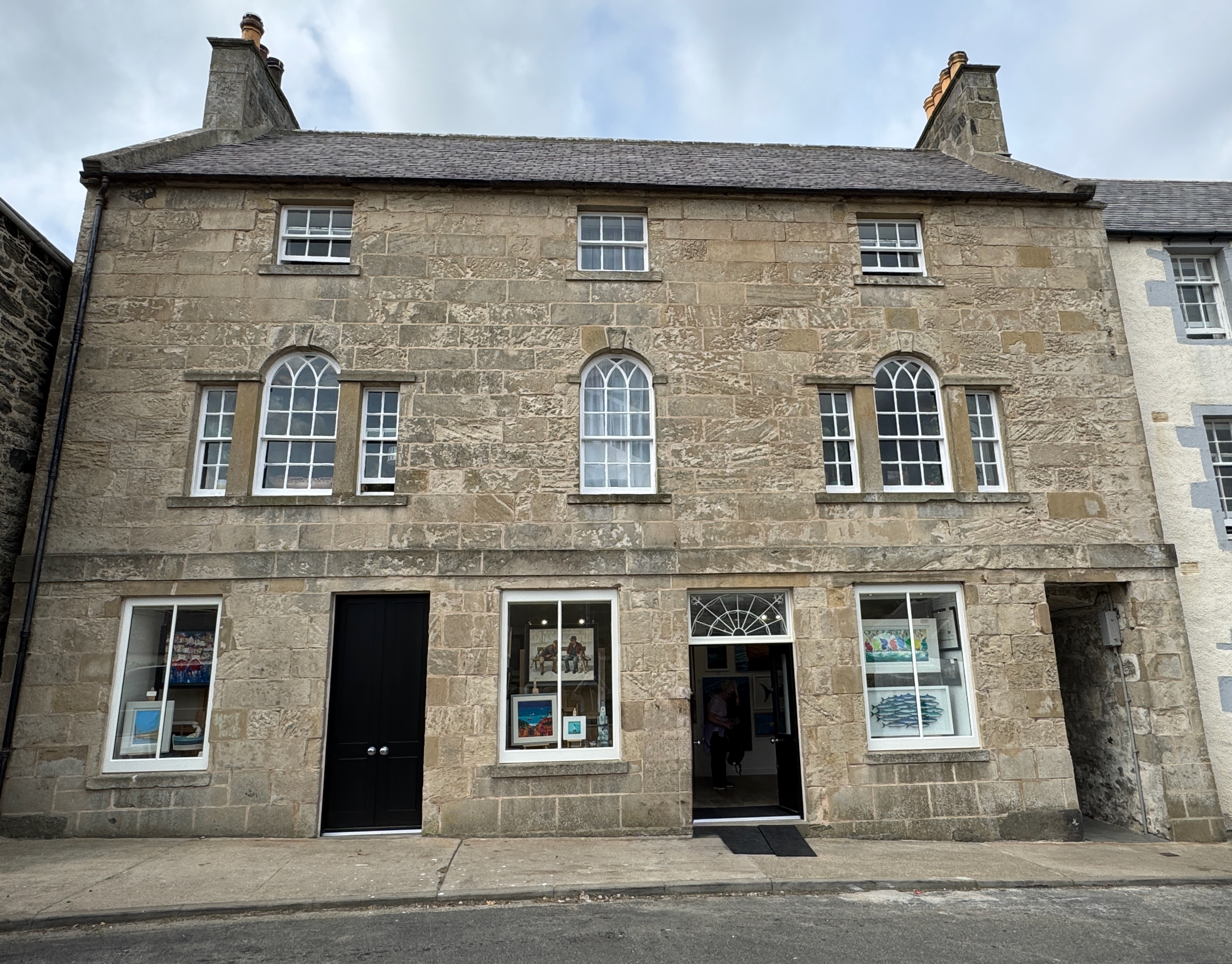
- The building in 2024

- Shown in Aberdeenshire Malvern, Portsoy (Scotland)
- 57.684137°N 2.69068°W
- Location: 21–23 Low Street, Portsoy

History
- Built: c. 1750 (276 years ago)

Listed Building – Category B
- Official name: 21, 23 Low Street, 'Malvern', and Garden Walls
- Designated: 22 February 1972
- Reference no.: LB40249

Malvern is a building standing at 21–23 Low Street in Portsoy, Aberdeenshire, Scotland. Dating to the mid-18th century, it is a Category B listed building.

The building is three storeys with three bays, standing on a slope leading down to the harbour. Its ground floor is six bays, with three windows and three doors. It has an ashlar frontage with polished ashlar dressings. Its harled rear faces North High Street. Its ground floor is commercial (formerly a bakery).

Its garden walls are made of rubble, with pedestrian access to North High Street.

Historic Environment Scotland classes Malvern and 29–33 Low Street as an "A Group".

== See also ==
- List of listed buildings in Portsoy, Aberdeenshire
