= Corf Warehouse =

Building in Scotland

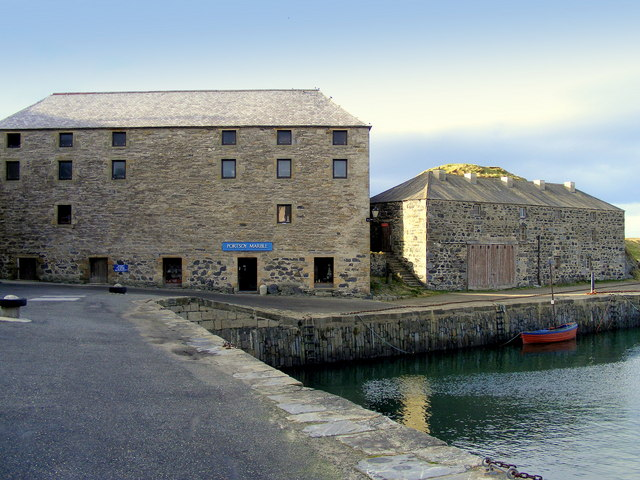
- The building (left) in 2008
- Location: Shorehead, Portsoy, Aberdeenshire, Scotland
- Coordinates: 57.68500°N 2.69155°W
- Built: 1765 (260 years ago)

Listed Building – Category A
- Official name: Shorehead, Corf Warehouse (Portsoy Marble)
- Designated: 22 February 1972
- Reference no.: LB40293

Corf Warehouse is a Category A listed building in Portsoy, Aberdeenshire, Scotland. Dating to 1765, it stands in Shorehead, on the western side of Portsoy harbour. The harbour itself is also Category A listed, dating to 1692. Corf is a Scottish word for salmon.

The building was designed by John Adam, and is a narrow, rectangular, four-storey structure with seven bays. Its ground-floor masonry features material from an earlier salmon-house, documented as 'Lord Findlater's Corf House'.

Historic Scotland assessed the building in a group containing 10 Shorehead, the adjacent Old Co-Operative Grain Store and the harbour.

The warehouse was one of six buildings in the harbour owned by Tom Burnett-Stuart. When he died, in January 2020, he left the buildings in the care of North East Scotland Preservation Trust (NESPT). The trust is based in Corf Warehouse. As of 2025, the building is also home to Portsoy Marble.

== See also ==
- List of listed buildings in Portsoy, Aberdeenshire
