= List of listed buildings in Portsoy, Aberdeenshire =

This is a list of listed buildings in the parish of Portsoy in Aberdeenshire, Scotland.

== List ==
Name	Location	Date Listed	Grid Ref. (Note: Sometimes known as OSGB36, the grid reference (where provided) is based on the British national grid reference system used by the Ordnance Survey. • "Guide to National Grid". Ordnance Survey. • "Get-a-map". Ordnance Survey.)	Geo-coordinates	Notes	LB Number (Note: Historic Environment Scotland assign a unique alphanumeric identifier to each designated site in Scotland, for listed buildings this always begins with "LB", for example "LB12345".)	Image
45 Seafield Street And Pend Arch To Commercial Hotel				57°40′54″N 2°41′14″W	Category C(S)	40276	Upload Photo
13 Seafield Terrace, Nile Cottage				57°40′49″N 2°41′41″W	Category B	40285	Upload Photo
40 South High Street				57°40′58″N 2°41′30″W	Category C(S)	40307	Upload Photo
18, 19 The Square				57°40′59″N 2°41′28″W	Category C(S)	40313	Upload Photo
18 Barbank Street				57°41′04″N 2°41′31″W	Category C(S)	40216	Upload Photo
9 Burnside And Garden Walls				57°40′58″N 2°41′25″W	Category C(S)	40218	Upload Photo
3 Church Street				57°40′54″N 2°41′17″W	Category C(S)	40219	Upload another image
15, 17, 19 Church Street				57°40′55″N 2°41′18″W	Category B	40220	Upload Photo
1 Main Street				57°41′07″N 2°41′16″W	Category C(S)	40252	Upload Photo
8 Main Street				57°41′06″N 2°41′16″W	Category C(S)	40257	Upload Photo
5, 7 North High Street And Rear Garden Walls				57°41′01″N 2°41′29″W	Category B	40261	Upload Photo
23, 25 And 27 North High Street And Rear Garden Walls				57°41′02″N 2°41′29″W	Category A	40262	Upload Photo
2 North High Street, The Boyne Hotel				57°41′01″N 2°41′28″W	Category C(S)	40264	Upload Photo
12 North High Street				57°41′02″N 2°41′28″W	Category B	40267	Upload Photo
22, 24 Seafield Street, 2 Roseacre Street				57°40′53″N 2°41′25″W	Category C(S)	40278	Upload Photo
18, 20 Shillinghill				57°40′56″N 2°41′21″W	Category B	40286	Upload Photo
22 Shillinghill And Front Garden				57°40′56″N 2°41′20″W	Category B	40287	Upload Photo
6, 7 Shorehead				57°41′04″N 2°41′29″W	Category B	40289	Upload another image
9 Shorehead				57°41′05″N 2°41′29″W	Category B	40290	Upload another image
Shorehead, Old Co-Operative Grain Store				57°41′07″N 2°41′30″W	Category B	40295	Upload another image
24 The Square				57°40′58″N 2°41′28″W	Category C(S)	40314	Upload Photo
5 Wood Street				57°41′07″N 2°41′15″W	Category C(S)	40319	Upload Photo
28-32 Church Street, Cottage To Rear				57°40′58″N 2°41′18″W	Category C(S)	40224	Upload Photo
52, 54 Church Street				57°41′01″N 2°41′22″W	Category C(S)	40229	Upload another image
56 Church Street And Rear Cottage				57°41′01″N 2°41′22″W	Category C(S)	40230	Upload Photo
40 Cullen Street And Rear Garden Wall				57°41′00″N 2°41′42″W	Category C(S)	40241	Upload Photo
3 Institute Street				57°40′58″N 2°41′19″W	Category C(S)	40244	Upload Photo
5 Institute Street				57°40′58″N 2°41′18″W	Category C(S)	40245	Upload Photo
Lodging Brae, 1, 2, 3, 4 Old Coastguards Houses				57°41′04″N 2°41′21″W	Category C(S)	40246	Upload Photo
31, 33 Low Street				57°41′04″N 2°41′27″W	Category B	40251	Upload Photo
4 Main Street				57°41′07″N 2°41′16″W	Category C(S)	40255	Upload Photo
4 North High Street				57°41′01″N 2°41′28″W	Category B	40265	Upload Photo
22, 24 North High Street				57°41′03″N 2°41′27″W	Category B	40269	Upload Photo
26 North High Street				57°41′04″N 2°41′27″W	Category B	40270	Upload Photo
1, 3 Seafield Street				57°40′54″N 2°41′32″W	Category C(S)	40274	Upload Photo
4 Seafield Terrace, Church Of Scotland Manse				57°40′52″N 2°41′40″W	Category B	40283	Upload another image
Shore Street, New Harbour				57°41′10″N 2°41′19″W	Category B	40298	Upload another image
17, 19, 21 South High Street				57°40′55″N 2°41′32″W	Category C(S)	40300	Upload Photo
47 South High Street, Clydesdale Bank				57°40′58″N 2°41′32″W	Category C(S)	40303	Upload Photo
14 South High Street				57°40′55″N 2°41′31″W	Category C(S)	40305	Upload Photo
St Comb's Road, Old Lifeboat House				57°40′57″N 2°41′06″W	Category B	40309	Upload Photo
13, 14 The Square				57°41′00″N 2°41′30″W	Category C(S)	40312	Upload Photo
5, 7 Aird Street				57°40′53″N 2°41′12″W	Category C(S)	40207	Upload Photo
1, 3, 5, 7, 9 Aird Street Walls Enclosing Rear Garden				57°40′54″N 2°41′10″W	Category C(S)	40209	Upload Photo
11, 13 Aird Street, Aird House And Garden Walls				57°40′52″N 2°41′12″W	Category C(S)	40210	Upload Photo
15 Aird Street				57°40′52″N 2°41′12″W	Category C(S)	40211	Upload Photo
31 Church Street				57°40′56″N 2°41′20″W	Category C(S)	40222	Upload Photo
34 Church Street				57°40′58″N 2°41′20″W	Category C(S)	40225	Upload Photo
84, 86 Church Street				57°41′03″N 2°41′25″W	Category C(S)	40232	Upload Photo
88, 88A Church Street				57°41′03″N 2°41′25″W	Category C(S)	40233	Upload Photo
6 Hill Street, With Garden Walls And Former Gig-House				57°40′55″N 2°41′35″W	Category B	40243	Upload Photo
29 Low Street				57°41′03″N 2°41′26″W	Category B	40250	Upload Photo
2 Main Street				57°41′07″N 2°41′17″W	Category C(S)	40253	Upload Photo
37 North High Street				57°41′04″N 2°41′29″W	Category C(S)	40263	Upload Photo
16, 18, 20 North High Street 'Old Star Inn'				57°41′03″N 2°41′28″W	Category A	40268	Upload Photo
3 Seafield Place And Rear Garden Walls				57°40′53″N 2°41′19″W	Category C(S)	40272	Upload Photo
2, 4 Seafield Street				57°40′53″N 2°41′31″W	Category B	40277	Upload Photo
10 Shorehead				57°41′05″N 2°41′30″W	Category A	40292	Upload another image
Shorehead, Corf Warehouse (Portsoy Marble)				57°41′06″N 2°41′30″W	Category A	40293	Upload another image
2, 4 Shore Street				57°41′06″N 2°41′23″W	Category C(S)	40297	Upload Photo
7, 9 South High Street				57°40′55″N 2°41′32″W	Category C(S)	40299	Upload Photo
36, 38 South High Street				57°40′58″N 2°41′29″W	Category C(S)	40306	Upload Photo
St Comb's Road, St Comb's Well				57°40′55″N 2°41′08″W	Category C(S)	40310	Upload Photo
2, 4 Bridge Street				57°41′00″N 2°41′24″W	Category C(S)	40217	Upload Photo
46, 48 Church Street, Morven				57°41′00″N 2°41′21″W	Category C(S)	40228	Upload Photo
5, 7, 9 Culbert Street				57°41′01″N 2°41′27″W	Category B	40235	Upload Photo
18, 20, 22 Culbert Street				57°41′00″N 2°41′25″W	Category B	40238	Upload Photo
10 North High Street				57°41′02″N 2°41′28″W	Category B	40266	Upload Photo
5 Seafield Place And Garden Walls				57°40′52″N 2°41′19″W	Category C(S)	40273	Upload Photo
Seafield Terrace, Episcopal Church Of St John The Baptist				57°40′53″N 2°41′35″W	Category B	40280	Upload another image
10 Shorehead, Warehouse Sited Immediately To East				57°41′05″N 2°41′30″W	Category C(S)	40291	Upload Photo
Shorehead, Old Harbour				57°41′06″N 2°41′28″W	Category A	40296	Upload another image
39, 41 South High Street				57°40′57″N 2°41′31″W	Category C(S)	40301	Upload Photo
26 The Square				57°40′58″N 2°41′29″W	Category C(S)	40315	Upload Photo
1 Wood Street				57°41′08″N 2°41′15″W	Category C(S)	40316	Upload Photo
1, 3 Aird Street				57°40′53″N 2°41′13″W	Category C(S)	40206	Upload Photo
17 Aird Street				57°40′52″N 2°41′12″W	Category C(S)	40212	Upload Photo
Church Street, Shore Inn With Boundary Wall				57°41′04″N 2°41′25″W	Category C(S)	40234	Upload another image
15 Hill Street				57°40′56″N 2°41′37″W	Category C(S)	40242	Upload Photo
17 Low Street				57°41′03″N 2°41′26″W	Category C(S)	40248	Upload Photo
6 Main Street				57°41′06″N 2°41′16″W	Category C(S)	40256	Upload Photo
Seafield Street, Church Hall And War Memorial				57°40′54″N 2°41′25″W	Category B	40275	Upload another image
26 Seafield Street, Bank Of Scotland				57°40′53″N 2°41′23″W	Category B	40279	Upload Photo
2 Seafield Terrace, 'sunnybank' And Garden Walls				57°40′52″N 2°41′39″W	Category B	40281	Upload Photo
The Square, The Hall				57°41′00″N 2°41′30″W	Category C(S)	40311	Upload another image
Aird Street, Roman Catholic Church Of The Annunciation And Enclosing Wall				57°40′43″N 2°41′20″W	Category B	40214	Upload Photo
29 Church Street				57°40′56″N 2°41′19″W	Category C(S)	40221	Upload Photo
11-21 (Odd Nos) Culbert Street And Courtyard Wall With Arched Entrance				57°41′01″N 2°41′25″W	Category B	40236	Upload Photo
36 Cullen Street				57°40′59″N 2°41′41″W	Category C(S)	40239	Upload Photo
21, 23 Low Street, 'Malvern', And Garden Walls				57°41′03″N 2°41′26″W	Category B	40249	Upload another image
9 Main Street				57°41′06″N 2°41′15″W	Category C(S)	40258	Upload Photo
Main Street, Salmon House And Ramp				57°41′06″N 2°41′14″W	Category B	40259	Upload Photo
1, 3 North High Street				57°41′01″N 2°41′30″W	Category B	40260	Upload Photo
Seafield Terrace, Church Of Scotland And Enclosing Walls				57°40′52″N 2°41′39″W	Category B	40282	Upload Photo
7 Seafield Terrace, 'Hermiston' With Garden Walls And Gatepiers				57°40′50″N 2°41′36″W	Category B	40284	Upload Photo
5 Shorehead				57°41′04″N 2°41′29″W	Category C(S)	40288	Upload Photo
43 South High Street				57°40′58″N 2°41′32″W	Category C(S)	40302	Upload Photo
Soy Park, Scout Hut (Former Railway Station)				57°40′45″N 2°41′25″W	Category C(S)	40308	Upload another image
3 Wood Street, 'Clifton'				57°41′07″N 2°41′14″W	Category C(S)	40318	Upload Photo
19, 21 Aird Street				57°40′52″N 2°41′11″W	Category C(S)	40213	Upload Photo
54 Aird Street, Presbytery, Rc Church Of The Annunciation And Garden Wall				57°40′43″N 2°41′19″W	Category B	40215	Upload Photo
38 Church Street, Millheugh House				57°40′59″N 2°41′20″W	Category B	40226	Upload Photo
60 Church Street				57°41′01″N 2°41′22″W	Category C(S)	40231	Upload Photo
13, 15 Low Street				57°41′02″N 2°41′26″W	Category B	40247	Upload Photo
3 Main Street				57°41′07″N 2°41′17″W	Category C(S)	40254	Upload Photo
26 Schoolhendry Street, The Brig				57°41′03″N 2°41′18″W	Category C(S)	40271	Upload Photo
Shorehead, Portsoy Marble Workshop (Former James Watt's Warehouse)				57°41′06″N 2°41′30″W	Category B	40294	Upload Photo
12 South High Street, The Elms, With Garden Walls				57°40′54″N 2°41′30″W	Category C(S)	40304	Upload Photo
2 Wood Street				57°41′07″N 2°41′15″W	Category C(S)	40317	Upload Photo
9 Aird Street And Steading				57°40′53″N 2°41′12″W	Category C(S)	40208	Upload Photo
28, 30, 32 Church Street, Soye House, And Rear Garden Walls				57°40′58″N 2°41′19″W	Category B	40223	Upload Photo
40, 42 Church Street				57°40′59″N 2°41′21″W	Category C(S)	40227	Upload Photo
14 Culbert Street				57°41′00″N 2°41′26″W	Category C(S)	40237	Upload Photo
38 Cullen St, 'Marine Villa' And Rear Garden Wall				57°40′59″N 2°41′42″W	Category C(S)	40240	Upload Photo

== Key ==
The scheme for classifying buildings in Scotland is:

- Category A: "buildings of national or international importance, either architectural or historic; or fine, little-altered examples of some particular period, style or building type."
- Category B: "buildings of regional or more than local importance; or major examples of some particular period, style or building type, which may have been altered."
- Category C: "buildings of local importance; lesser examples of any period, style, or building type, as originally constructed or moderately altered; and simple traditional buildings which group well with other listed buildings."

In March 2016 there were 47,288 listed buildings in Scotland. Of these, 8% were Category A, and 50% were Category B, with the remaining 42% being Category C.

== See also ==
- List of listed buildings in Aberdeenshire
