= 10 Shorehead =

Building in Scotland

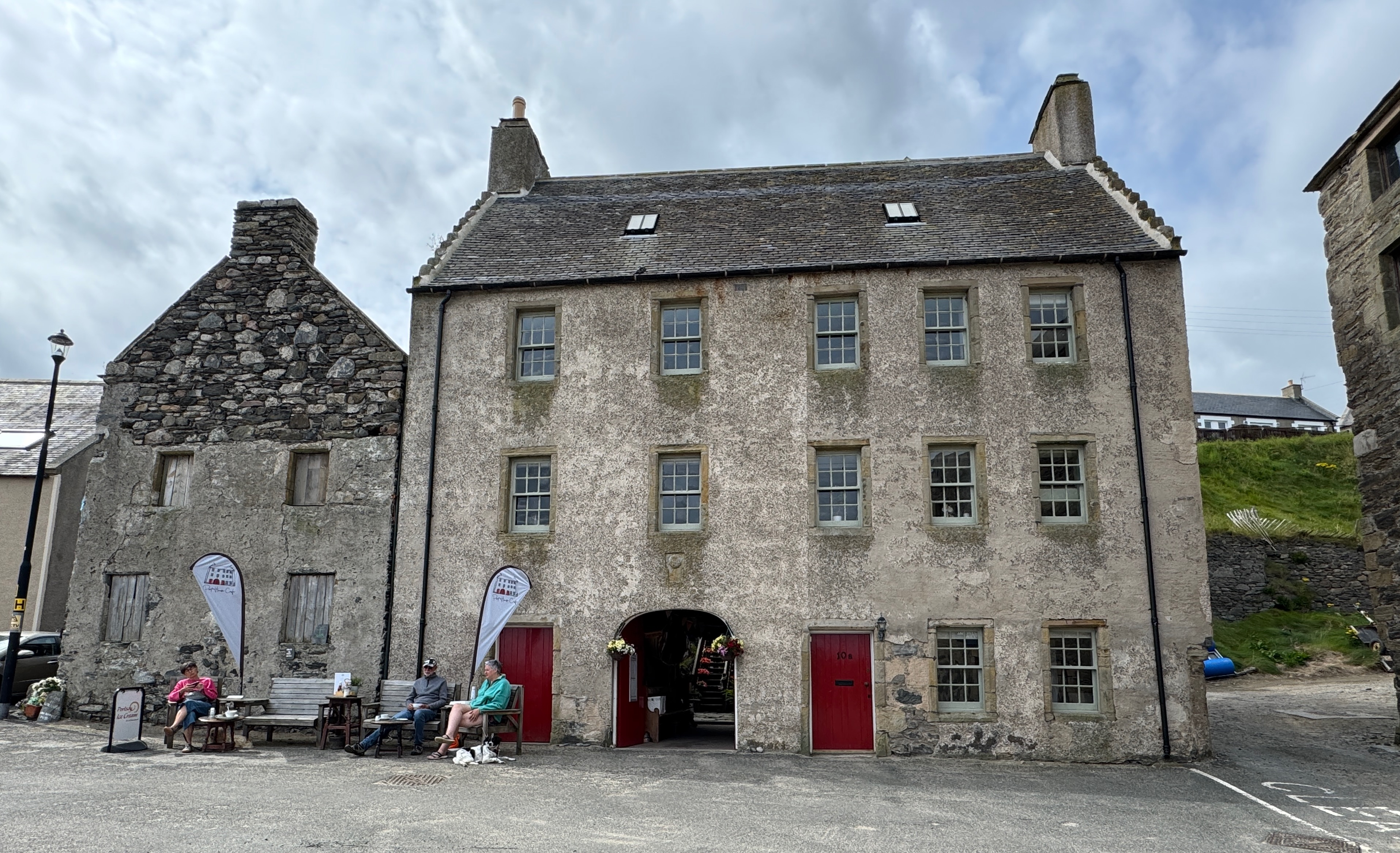
- The building in 2024
- Location: Shorehead, Portsoy, Aberdeenshire, Scotland
- Coordinates: 57.68478°N 2.69168°W
- Built: 1726 (299 years ago)

Listed Building – Category C(S)
- Official name: 10 Shorehead
- Designated: 22 February 1972
- Reference no.: LB40292

10 Shorehead is a Category C listed building in Portsoy, Aberdeenshire, Scotland. Dating to 1726, it stands in Shorehead, in the southwestern corner of Portsoy harbour. The harbour itself is Category A listed, dating to 1692. The building's former warehouse, located adjacent to the east, is also Category C listed. It dates to the late 18th century.

The building, which was built by a merchant, David Brebner, is three storeys with an attic in an L-plan range. It has harled ashlar margins. There is an entrance to the attic in the southern gable of the wing reach from Barbank Street. A skewputt on the northeastern side of the building is dated 1727. Brebner's son, Alexander, inherited the property.

In 1971, work was being done on the building. The following year, Historic Scotland assessed the building in a group containing the adjacent (to the west) Corf Warehouse, Old Co-Operative Grain Store and the harbour.

The structure was listed on Scotland's Buildings at Risk Register between 1994 and 2013.

The warehouse was one of six buildings in the harbour owned by Tom Burnett-Stuart. When he died, in January 2020, he left the buildings in the care of North East Scotland Preservation Trust (NESPT).

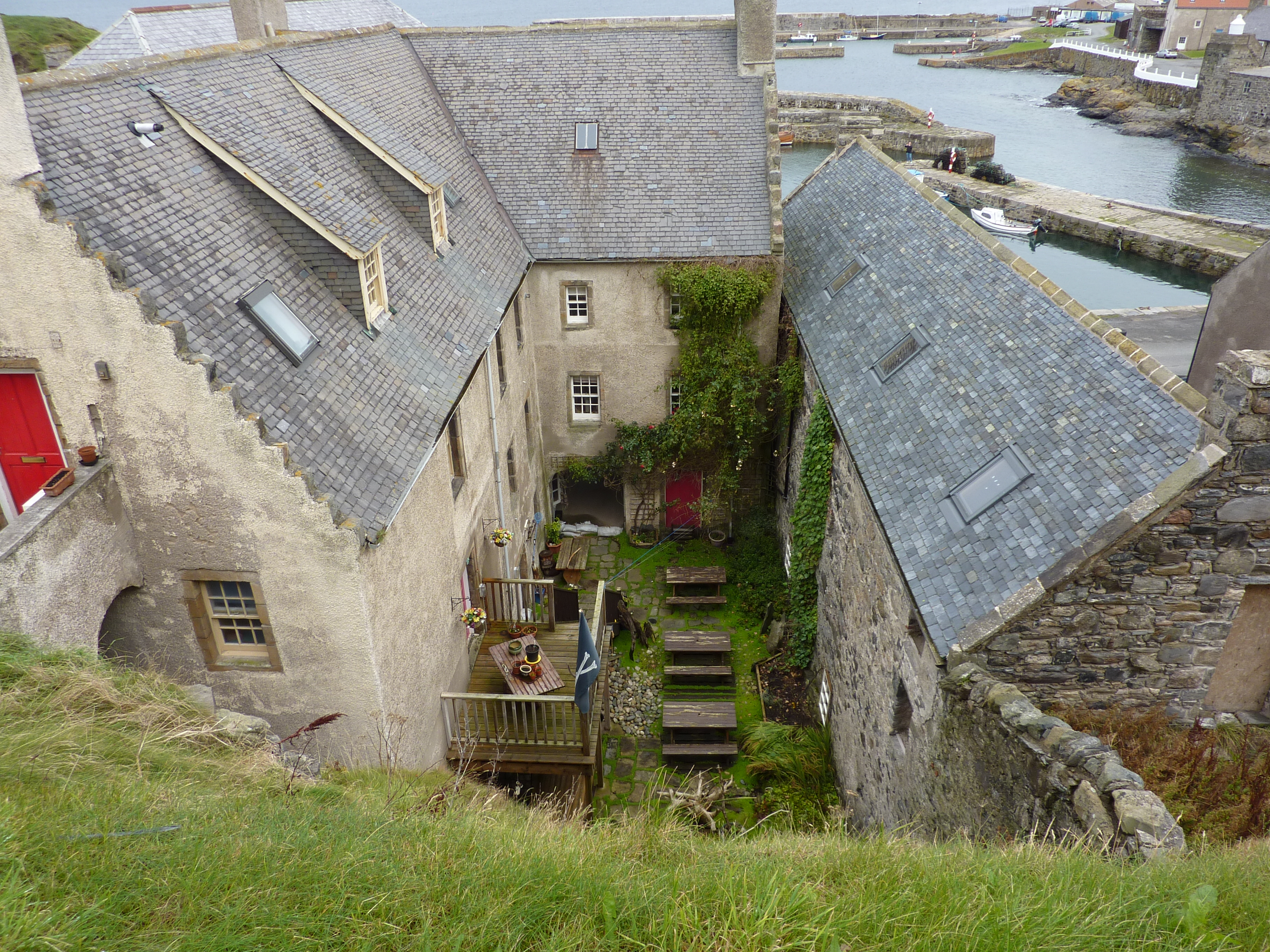
The back garden, located between the main building and the warehouse (right)

== See also ==
- List of listed buildings in Portsoy, Aberdeenshire
