= 60 Church Street, Portsoy =

Building in Portsoy, Scotland

60 Church Street
- Shown in Aberdeenshire 60 Church Street, Portsoy (Scotland)
- 57.683604°N 2.689479°W
- Location: 60 Church Street, Portsoy

History
- Built: c. 1820 (206 years ago)

Listed Building – Category C(S)
- Official name: 60 Church Street
- Designated: 22 February 1972
- Reference no.: LB40231

60 Church Street is a building in Portsoy, Aberdeenshire, Scotland. Dating to the early 19th century, it is a Category C listed building.

The building is a single-storey cottage with a dormerless attic. It is three bays.

== See also ==
- List of listed buildings in Portsoy, Aberdeenshire
