= 52–54 Church Street, Portsoy =

Building in Portsoy, Scotland

52–54 Church Street
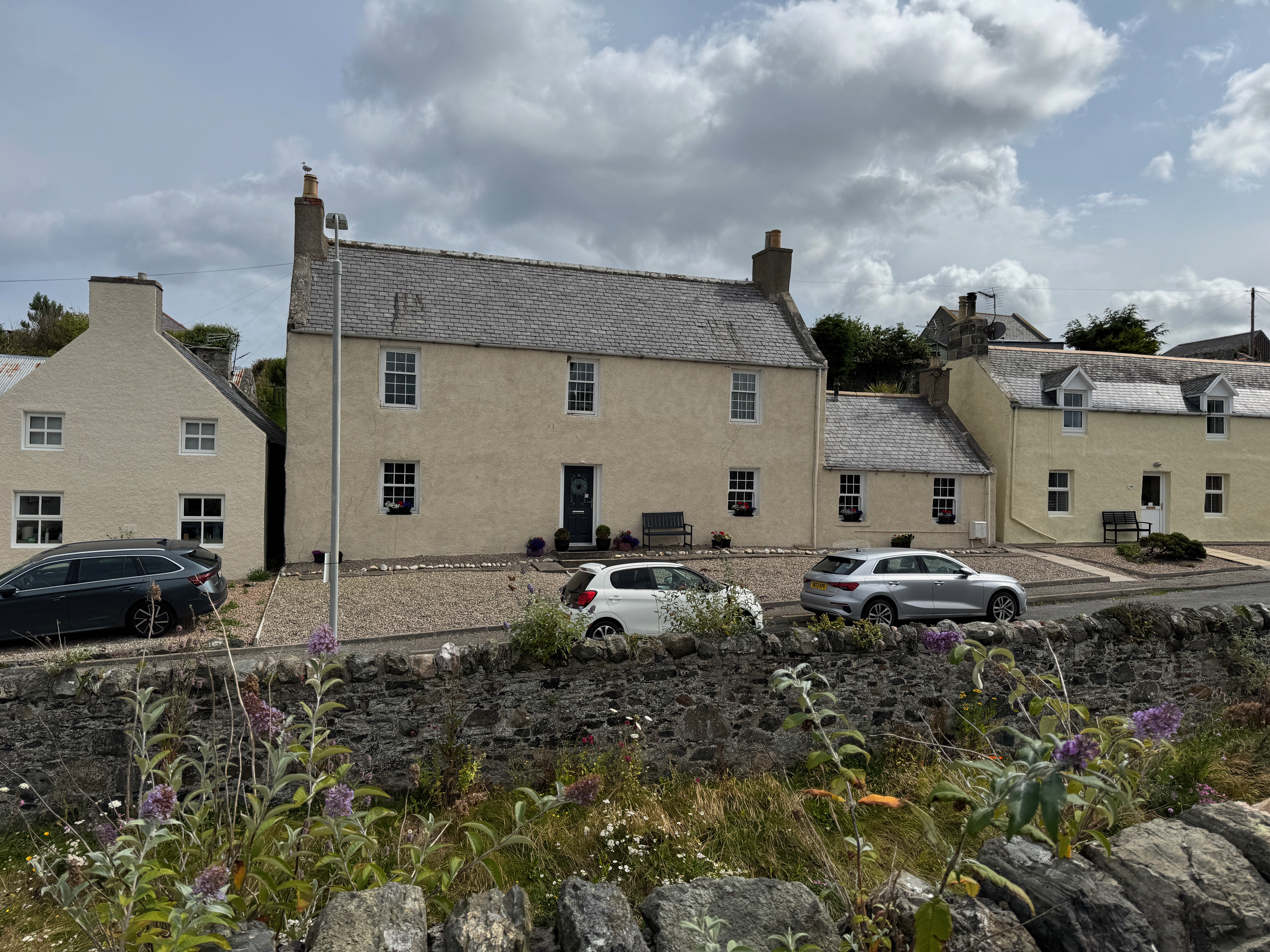
- The building in 2024

- Shown in Aberdeenshire 52–54 Church Street, Portsoy (Scotland)
- 57.683480°N 2.689326°W
- Location: 52–54 Church Street, Portsoy

History
- Built: c. 1790 (236 years ago)

Listed Building – Category C(S)
- Official name: 52, 54 Church Street
- Designated: 22 February 1972
- Reference no.: LB40229

52–54 Church Street is a building in Portsoy, Aberdeenshire, Scotland. Dating to the late 18th century, it is a Category C listed building.

== Description ==
The building is a two-storey home with a single-storey, single-bay wing at its southern gable. It is harled with plain reveals. Its central door provides access to Number 52, while Number 54 (first floor of main house) is accessed via a wing to the rear.

== See also ==
- List of listed buildings in Portsoy, Aberdeenshire
