= Portsoy Harbour =

Harbour in Portsoy, Scotland

Coordinates: 57.685414°N 2.690157°W

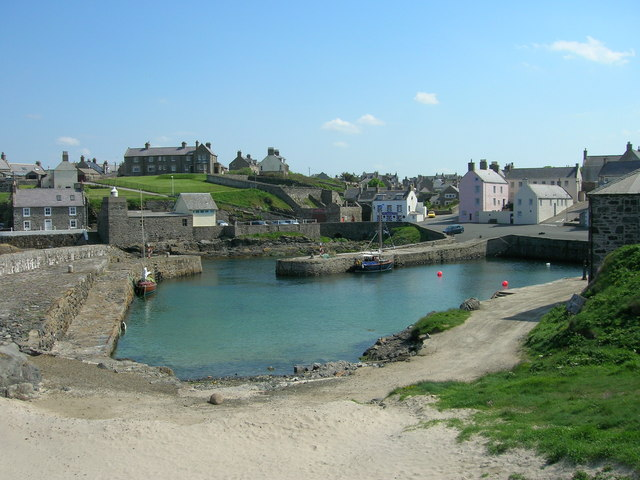
- Portsoy Harbour, looking southeast (2008)
- Interactive map of Portsoy Harbour

Location
- Country: United Kingdom
- Location: Portsoy, Aberdeenshire, Scotland

Details
- No. of piers: 1

Portsoy Harbour (also known as Portsoy's Old Harbour) is a harbour in Portsoy, Aberdeenshire, Scotland. Situated immediately to the north of Portsoy's village centre and a few yards west of Links Bay, the harbour was established in 1692. It is now a Category A listed structure.

The harbour is accessed from the village centre by either High Street or Low Street, or from Links Bay via Shore Street. North High Street enters the harbour at Shorehead; Low Street at Shore Street. Both run along the southern edge of the harbour. Shore Street and Shorehead merge at Low Street.

A more modern, smaller harbour is located in the northeastern corner of the promontory. It is known as Portsoy New Harbour.

== Buildings and structures ==
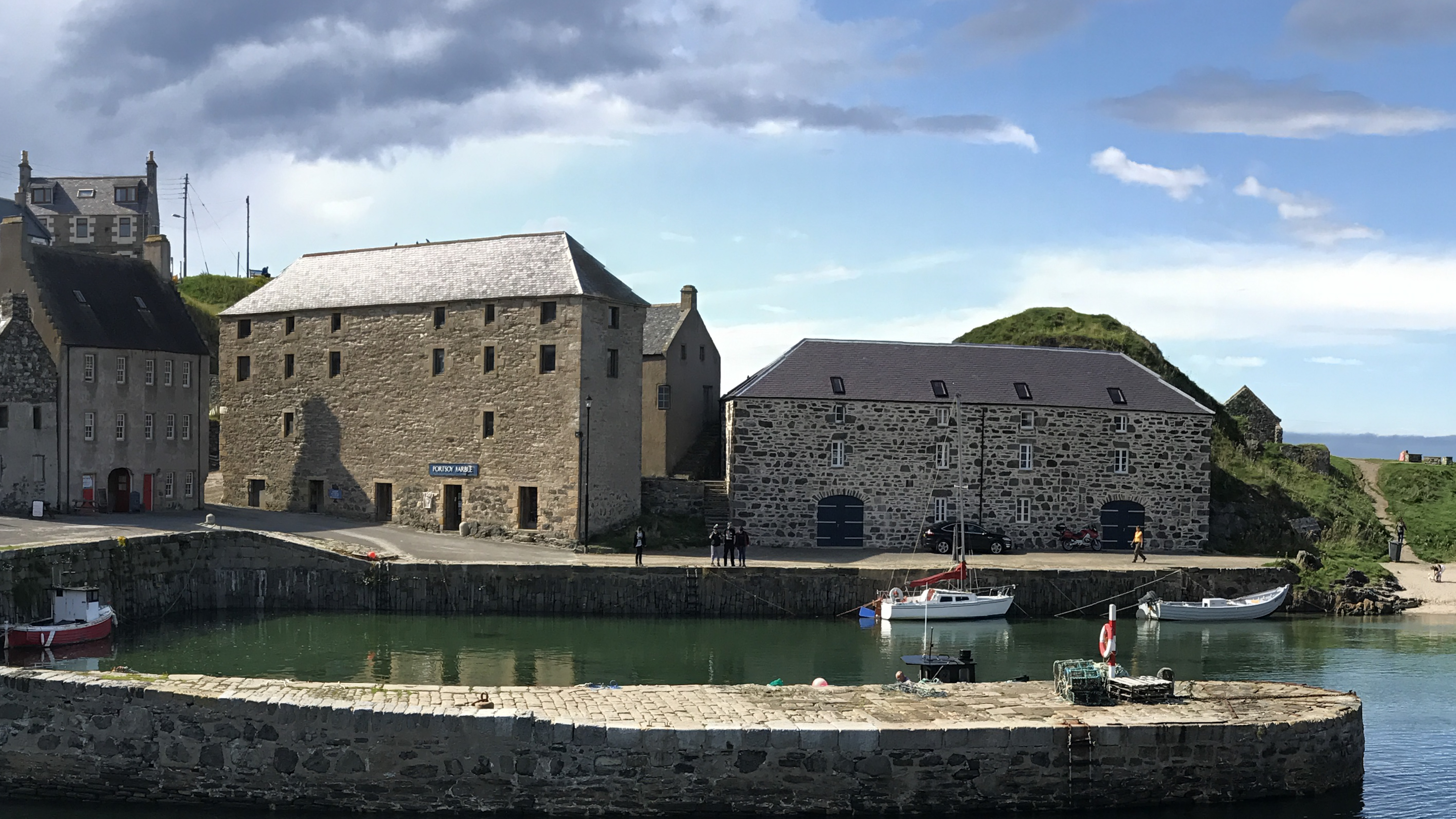
Corf Warehouse and the Old Co-Operative Grain Store form the western side of the harbour (2017)

Several listed buildings surround the eastern, southern and western sides of the harbour. They are (clockwise from the east):

- New Harbour, Shore Street (1828; Category B listed)
- 2 and 4 Shore Street (early 19th century; Category C listed)
- Shore Inn (mid-18th century; Category C listed)
- 5 Shorehead (1899; Category C listed)
- 6 and 7 Shorehead (late 18th century; Category B listed)
- 9 Shorehead (circa 1800; Category B listed)
- 10 Shorehead warehouse (late 18th century; Category C listed)
- 10 Shorehead (1726; Category A listed)
- Corf Warehouse, Shorehead (1765; Category A listed)
- Former James Watt Warehouse (mid-18th century; Category B listed)
- Old Co-Operative Grain Store, Shorehead (late 18th century; Category B listed)

== See also ==
- List of ports and harbours in Scotland
