= Shore Inn =

Public house in Portsoy, Scotland

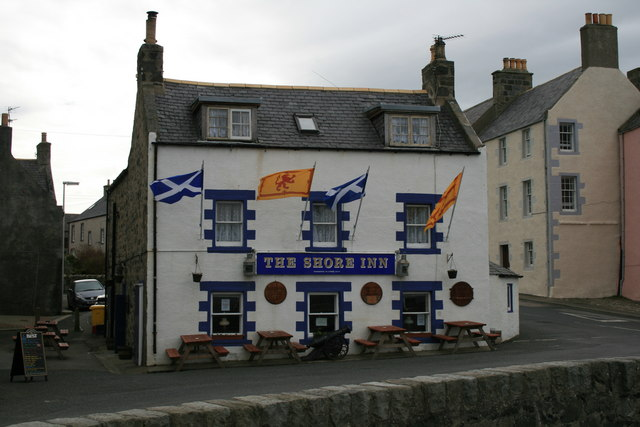
- The building in 2007
- Interactive map of the Shore Inn area

General information
- Type: Public house
- Location: Shore Street, Portsoy; Aberdeenshire, Scotland
- Coordinates: 57°41′04″N 2°41′25″W
- Completed: mid-18th century

Design and construction
- Designations: Category C listed

The Shore Inn is a public house in Portsoy, Aberdeenshire, Scotland. It stands on Shore Street, overlooking Portsoy's harbour, at the point where Shore Street meets Church Street and Shorehead. The building has a mid-18th-century core that was later remodelled, and it has been a Category C listed building since 1972, the listing covering the inn together with its boundary wall. A traditional coastal bar, it is described by the Campaign for Real Ale as a "howff" and serves changing Scottish ales; it is typically busy during the Portsoy boat festival held in early July.

== Description ==
The inn is of two storeys with an attic. Its three-bay north elevation, which faces Shorehead, is regularly fenestrated, with a side entrance in the east gable and a rear wing that gives the building an L-plan. The frontage, the west gable and the yard wall facing Church Street are harled with contrasting painted margins, and there is a canted single-storey addition, while the east return gable is of rubble. Two flat-roofed dormers rise from the wallhead of the north elevation. The windows are mostly plate glass set in timber sash-and-case frames. The masonry end stacks date from the 19th century, and the roof is slate with a pottery ridge.

== 2020 planning application ==
In 2020 the pub's owners sought permission to replace the timber dormer windows on the upper floor with a wood-grain uPVC alternative, arguing that the timber frames were costly to maintain because reaching them—more than 20 feet (6.1 m) above the ground—required scaffolding. The application, which also proposed re-tiling part of the roof and forming a new entrance on the west side of the building, was considered by Aberdeenshire Council's Banff and Buchan Area Committee. Council officers recommended refusal, noting that the inn lies within the Portsoy Conservation Area, on which substantial sums had been spent between 2011 and 2016, and that Historic Environment Scotland regards uPVC windows as rarely acceptable in listed buildings of this kind; they also warned that permitting inauthentic materials could make it harder to attract future heritage funding, and that film crews had been drawn to Portsoy precisely because of the traditional appearance of its harbour buildings. One councillor spoke in favour of the application, citing the financial pressures on the hospitality sector. The committee refused the application by five votes to four in November 2020.

== Filming location ==
Portsoy and its harbour, which the inn overlooks, have repeatedly been used as a filming location. The village was the principal location for the 2016 remake of the Ealing comedy Whisky Galore!, standing in for the fictional island of Todday.

The inn itself featured in the sixth series of the BBC television series Peaky Blinders, scenes for which were filmed in Portsoy in early 2021. For the production the harbour was dressed to represent the fictional Miquelon Island, and the inn was renamed the Hotel Lalanne.

== Gallery ==
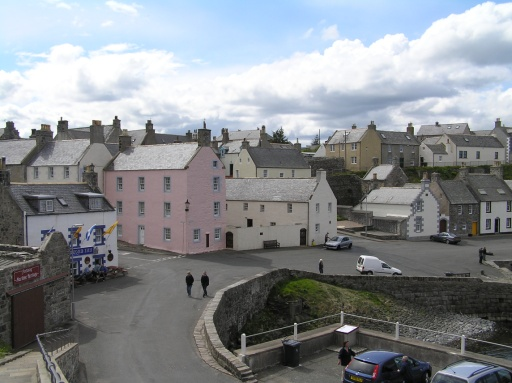
The inn, looking southwest

== See also ==
- List of listed buildings in Portsoy, Aberdeenshire
