= Links Bay =

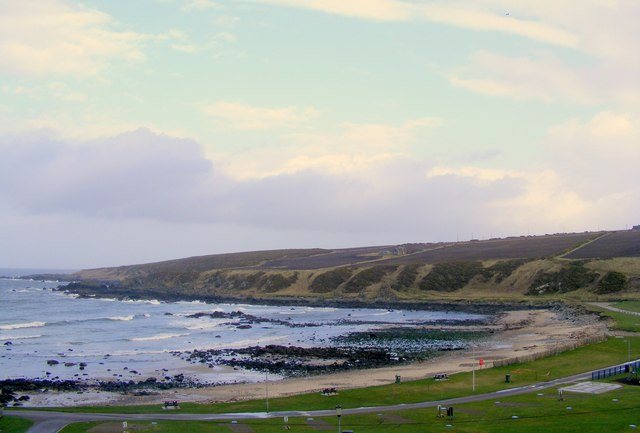
- Looking east

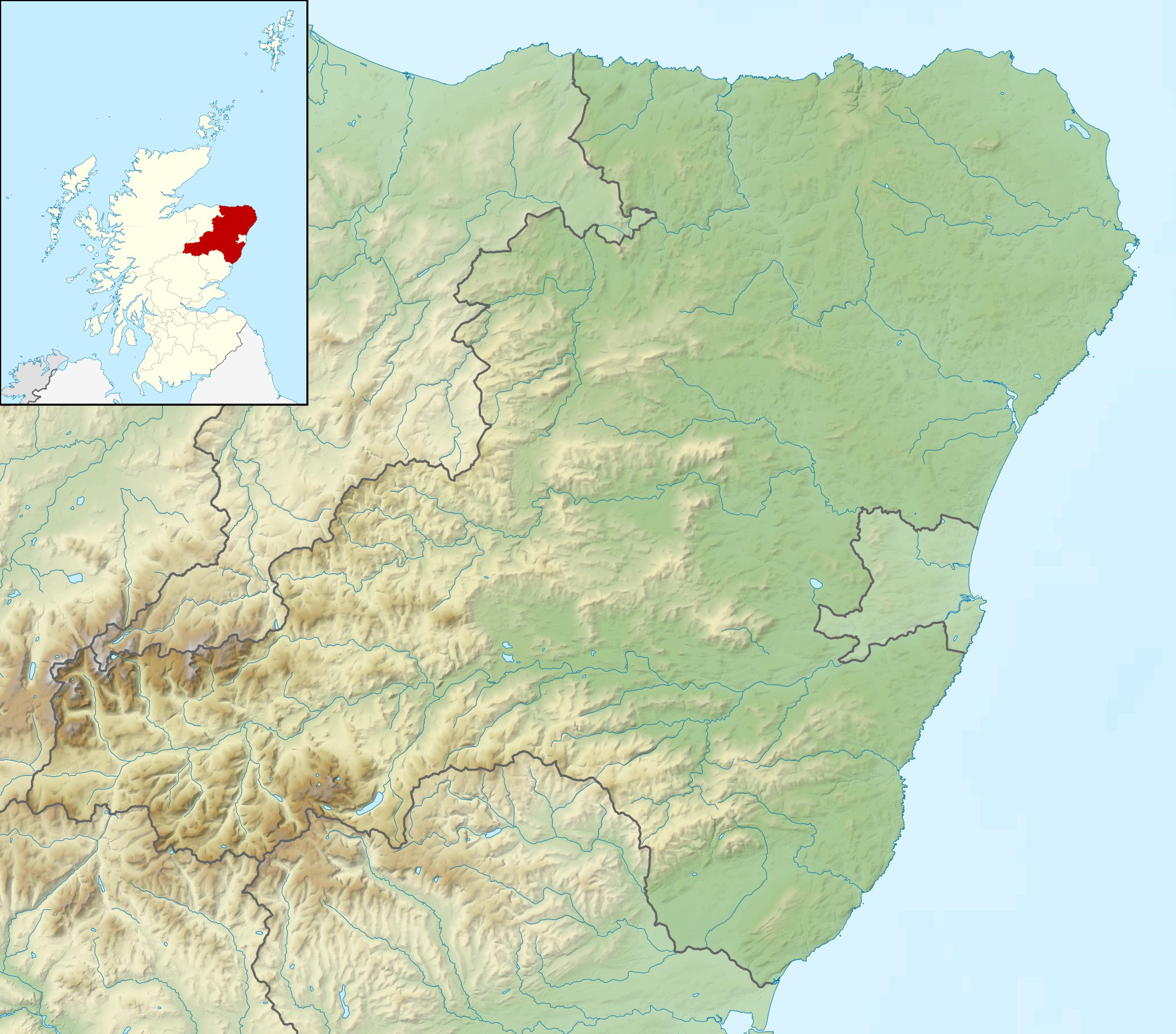
- Location within Aberdeenshire
- Location: Aberdeenshire, Scotland
- Coordinates: 57.6847074°N 2.6833384°W
- Primary inflows: Burn of Durn

Links Bay is a bay in Aberdeenshire, Scotland, located immediately east of Portsoy harbour. The site of St Columba's Well, the bay was also the reputed site of St Columba's Chapel.

The Burn of Durn flows into the bay.
