= Old Town Hall, Portsoy =

Municipal building in Portsoy, Scotland

Old Town Hall
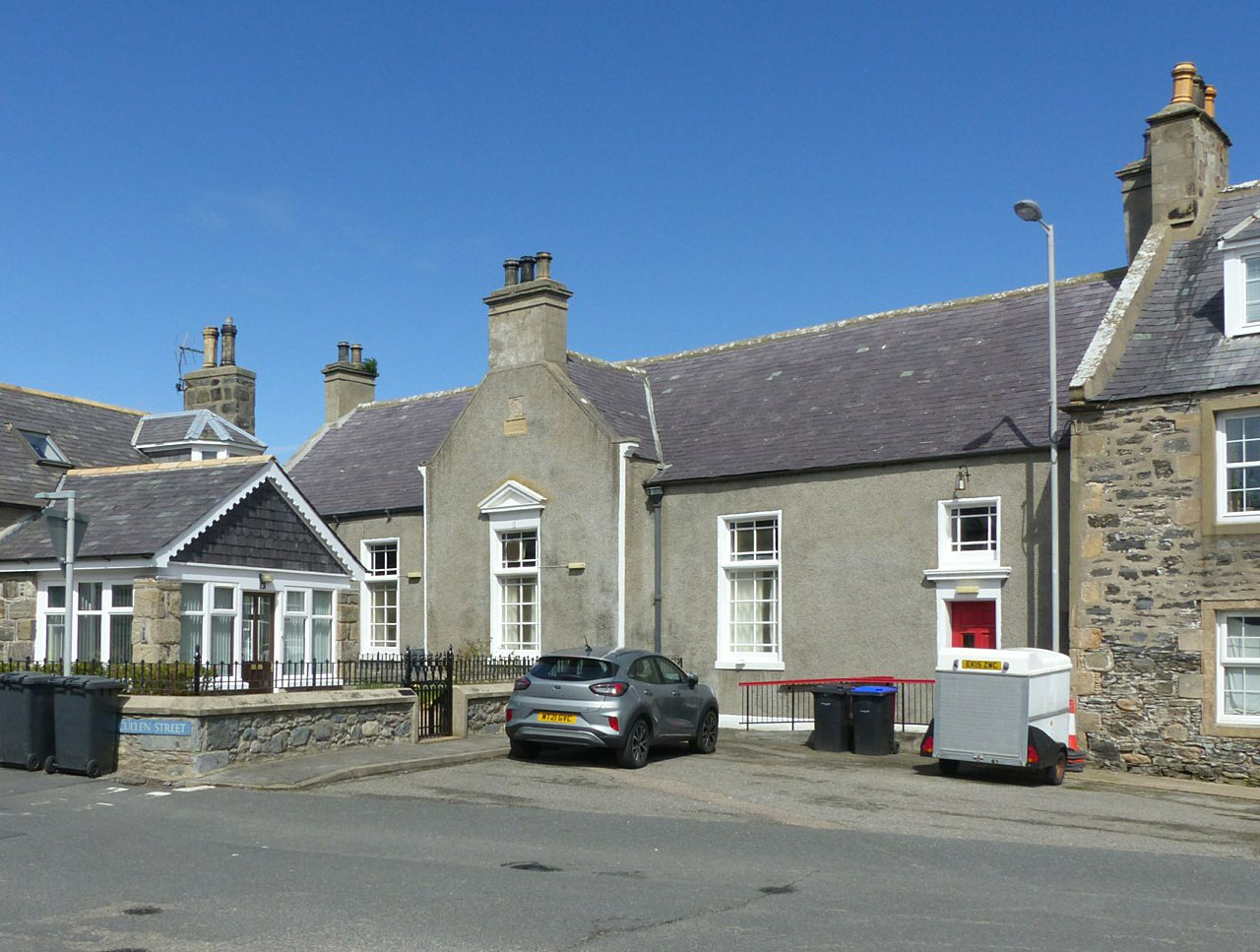
- Old Town Hall

- Shown in Aberdeenshire Old Town Hall, Portsoy (Scotland)
- 57.6834°N 2.6919°W
- Location: The Square, Portsoy

History
- Built: 1798 (228 years ago)

Site notes
- Architectural style: Neoclassical style

Listed Building – Category C(S)
- Official name: The Square, The Hall
- Designated: 22 February 1972
- Reference no.: LB40311

The Old Town Hall is a municipal building on the north side of The Square in Portsoy, Aberdeenshire, Scotland. The structure, which is used for religious gatherings, is a Category C listed building.

== History ==
The site was purchased on 31 May 1798 by William Ritchie, mason and master, and James Bremner, of Lintmill of Boyne, treasurer, on behalf of St Steven's Lodge of Freemasons of Portsoy. The building was designed in the neoclassical style, constructed in brick with a harled finish and was completed later in 1798. The design involved a symmetrical main frontage with five bays facing onto The Square. The central bay, which projected forward, featured a sash window with a pediment, and a date stone in the centre of the gable above, which was itself surmounted by a chimney. The bays on either side of the central bay were fenestrated with plain sash windows while the outer bays contained doorways with architraves and square-shaped fanlights. The sash windows and fanlights all featured a distinctive bordered glazing pattern. The masons held the building until 1832, when it passed to William Minty and became known as Mr Minty's Hall.

The building, which was remodelled in 1892 to serve as Portsoy Town Hall, was used for recruitment meetings at the start of the First World War and then briefly served as a drill station for the local platoon from A company of the 6th (Banff and Donside) Battalion, The Gordon Highlanders, before the battalion was deployed for service to the Western Front in November 1914. After the war, the burgh council established itself in a new hall in Seafield Street which had been built as a church and completed in 1875.

Following its own recruitment campaign, the local branch the Salvation Army acquired the building in The Square in 1923. The Salvation Army enjoyed a revival of its activities in 1949, but after its numbers dwindled, the hall closed in 1990. The building was subsequently used by the local branch of the Jehovah's Witnesses and was designated the local Kingdom Hall. In 2015, the building was transferred to the management of a Scottish Charitable Incorporated Organisation (SCIO) known as the "Portsoy Community Church", which leased the former Salvation Army Hall from Aberdeenshire Council. Organisations which subsequently chose to use the building included the local branch of the Destiny Church, which is a Pentecostal Charismatic Christianity group served by a local pastor.

== See also ==
- List of listed buildings in Portsoy, Aberdeenshire
