= North East Scotland Preservation Trust =

- Abbreviation: NESPT
- Founded: 1985 (41 years ago)
- Type: Scottish Charity
- Purpose: Bringing derelict, disused and redundant buildings back to life in the Aberdeenshire area and beyond
- Location: Portsoy, Aberdeenshire, UK
- Region served: North East Scotland
- Services: Preservation
- Website: https://nespt.org/

The North East Scotland Preservation Trust (NESPT) is a Building Preservation Trust (BPT), founded in 1985, which acquires and restores historically or architecturally significant properties in North East Scotland that cannot be restored in conventional ways.

The trust, which is based in Portsoy, Aberdeenshire, was established via an initiative between Grampian Regional Council and the Scottish Civic Trust. Its office is located in Portsoy's Corf Warehouse.

As of 2024, Paul Higson is NESPT's project director.
