= Portsoy =

Port village in Aberdeenshire, Scotland

Coordinates: 57.683°N 2.688°W

Portsoy: Scottish Gaelic: Port Saoidh
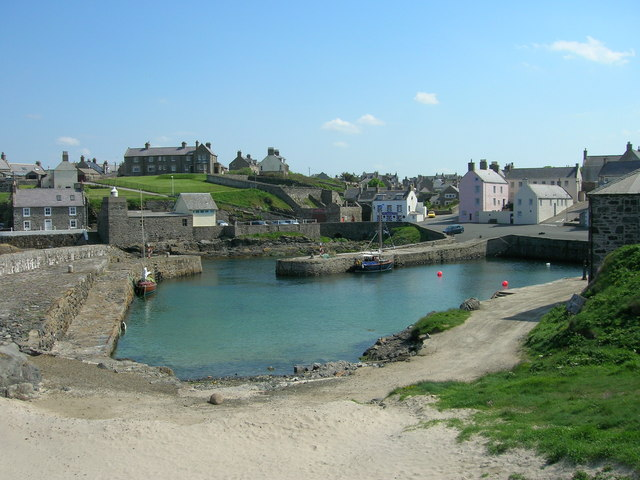
- Portsoy old harbour

- Location within Aberdeenshire
- Population: 1,690 (2020)
- OS grid reference: NJ589660
  - Edinburgh: 121 mi (195 km)
  - London: 439 mi (707 km)
- Council area: Aberdeenshire
- Lieutenancy area: Aberdeenshire
- Country: Scotland
- Sovereign state: United Kingdom
- Post town: BANFF
- Postcode district: AB45
- Dialling code: 01261
- Police: Scotland
- Fire: Scottish
- Ambulance: Scottish
- UK Parliament: Aberdeenshire North and Moray East
- Scottish Parliament: Banffshire and Buchan Coast

Portsoy (Scottish Gaelic: Port Saoidh) is a small town in Aberdeenshire, Scotland. Historically, Portsoy was in Banffshire until 1975. The original name may come from Port Saoithe, meaning "saithe harbour". Portsoy is located on the Moray Firth coast of northeast Scotland, 50 miles (80 km) northwest of Aberdeen and 65 miles (105 km) east of Inverness. It had a population of 1,752 at the time of the 2011 census.

== History ==
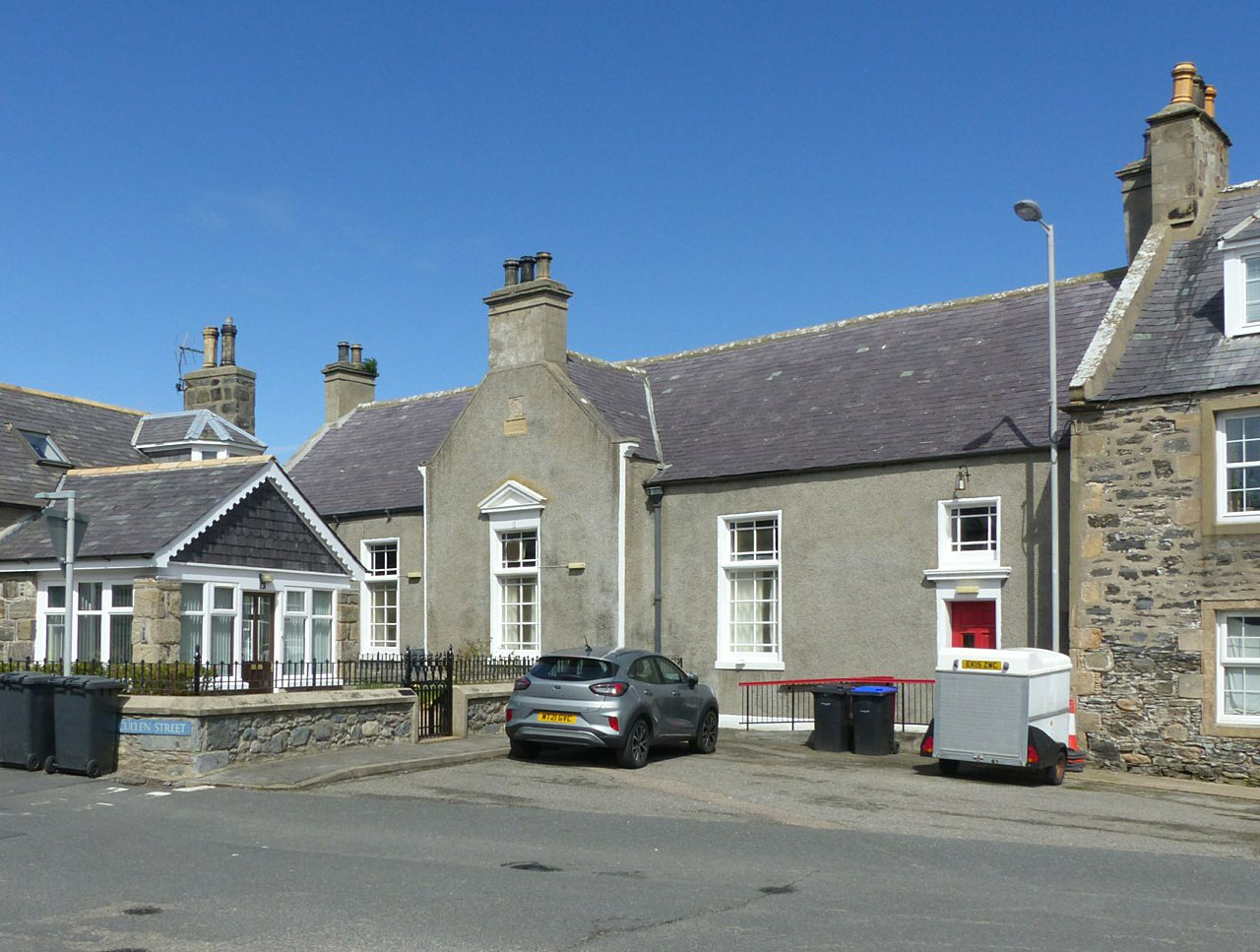
The Old Town Hall, now used as a venue for religious gatherings

Portsoy became a burgh of barony in 1550, under Sir Walter Ogilvie of Boyne Castle, and the charter was confirmed by parliament in 1581.

From the 16th century until 1975, Portsoy was in the civil and religious parish of Fordyce but was administered by its own Town Council and Banffshire County Council.

Following the commencement of the Local Government (Scotland) Act 1973, on 16 May 1975, lower Banffshire, including Portsoy, became part of Banff & Buchan District Council area which was, in turn, part of the larger Grampian Regional Council area.

A further reorganisation of local government in Scotland came via the Local Government etc. (Scotland) Act 1994. With effect from 1 April 1996, 32 unitary authorities came into existence covering the whole of Scotland, Banff & Buchan District Council and Grampian Regional Council ceased to exist and Portsoy came under the jurisdiction of the Aberdeenshire Council unitary authority.

The "old harbour" dates to the 17th century and is the oldest on the Moray Firth. The "new harbour" was built in 1825 for the growing herring fishery, which at its peak reached 57 boats. The Old Town Hall in The Square was completed in 1798.

=== Fishing ===
The following statistics for Portsoy in the years before the First World War were obtained from the annual reports of the Fishery Board.

Fishery Statistics

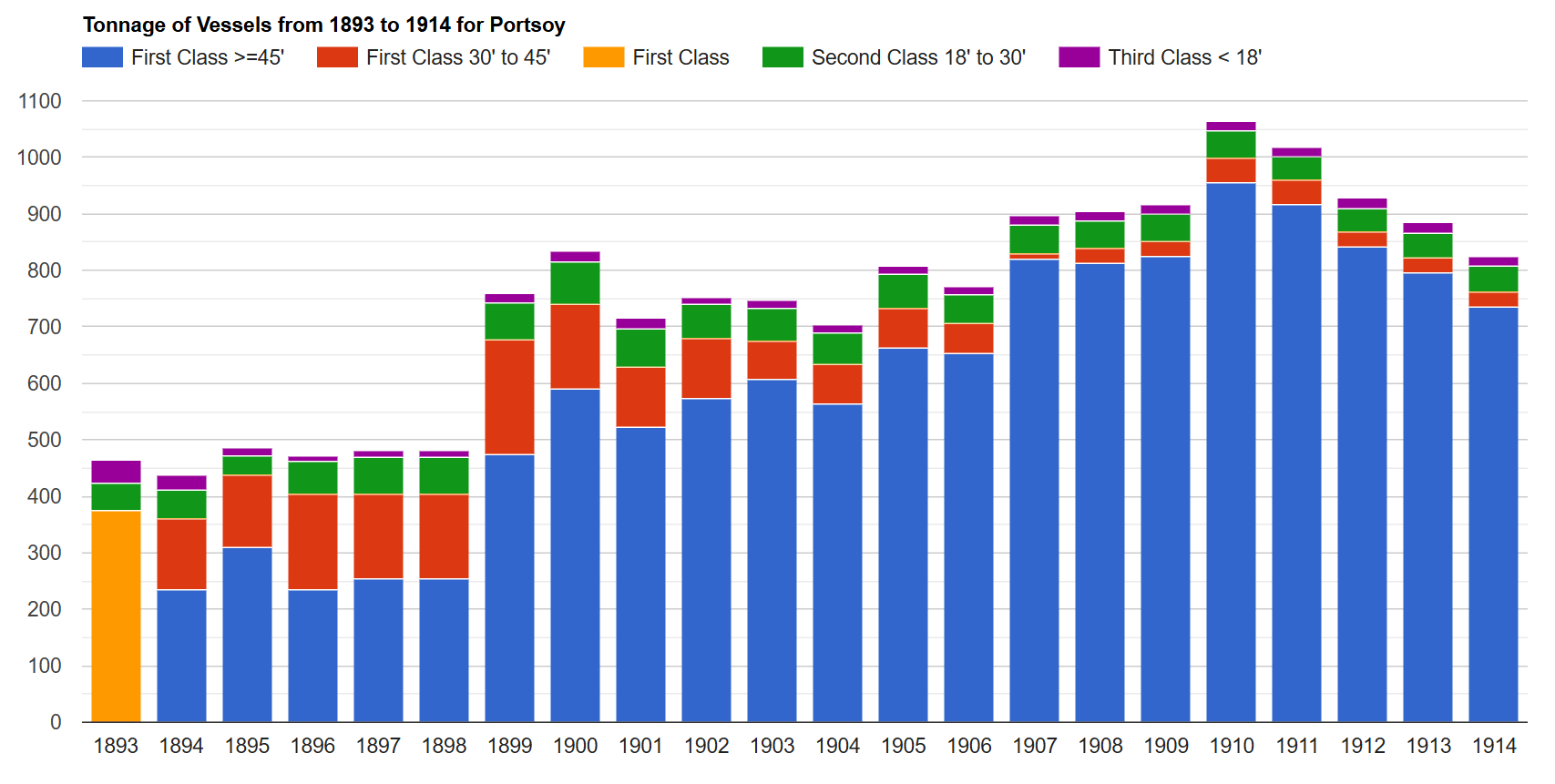
Tonnage of vessels

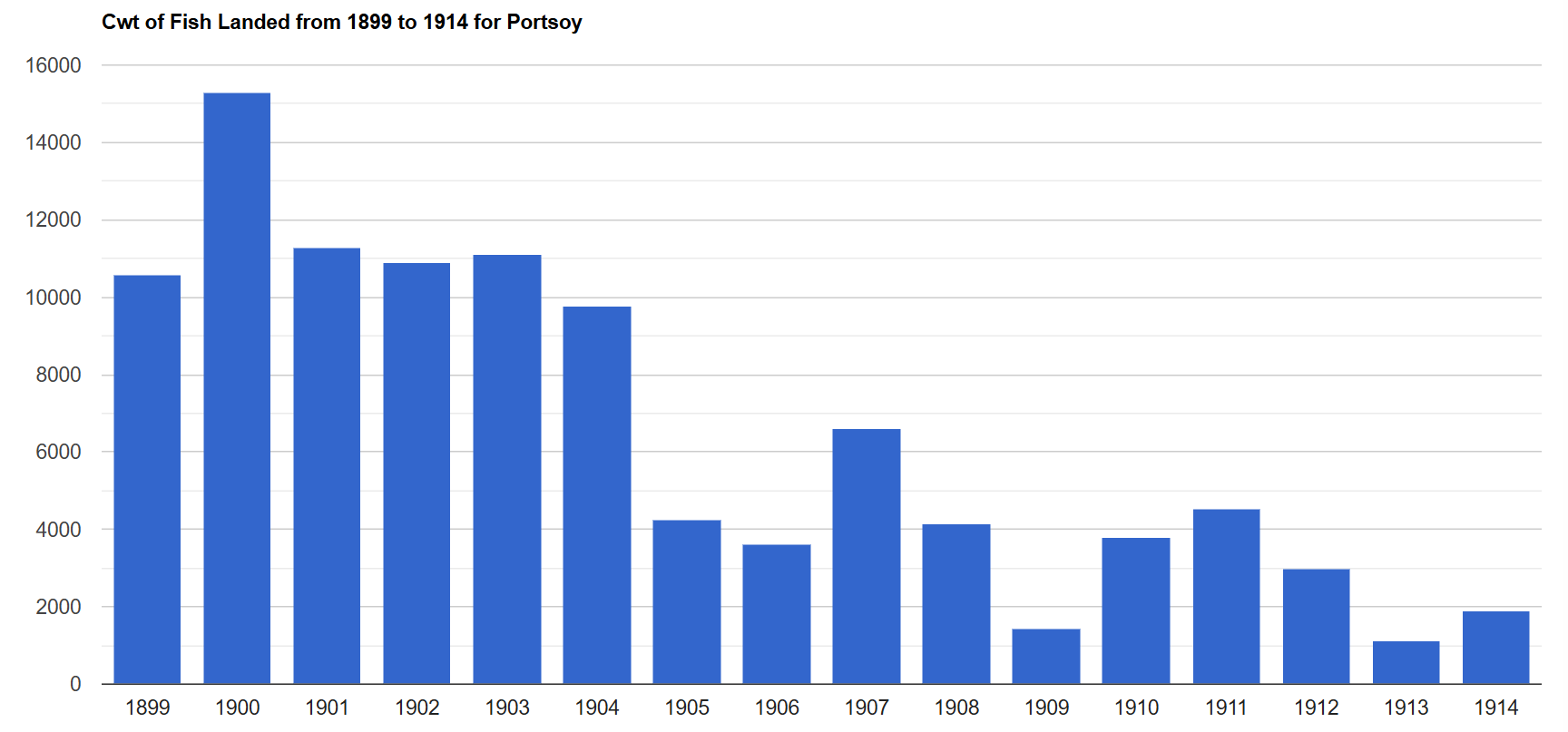
Cwt of fish landed (excluding shellfish)

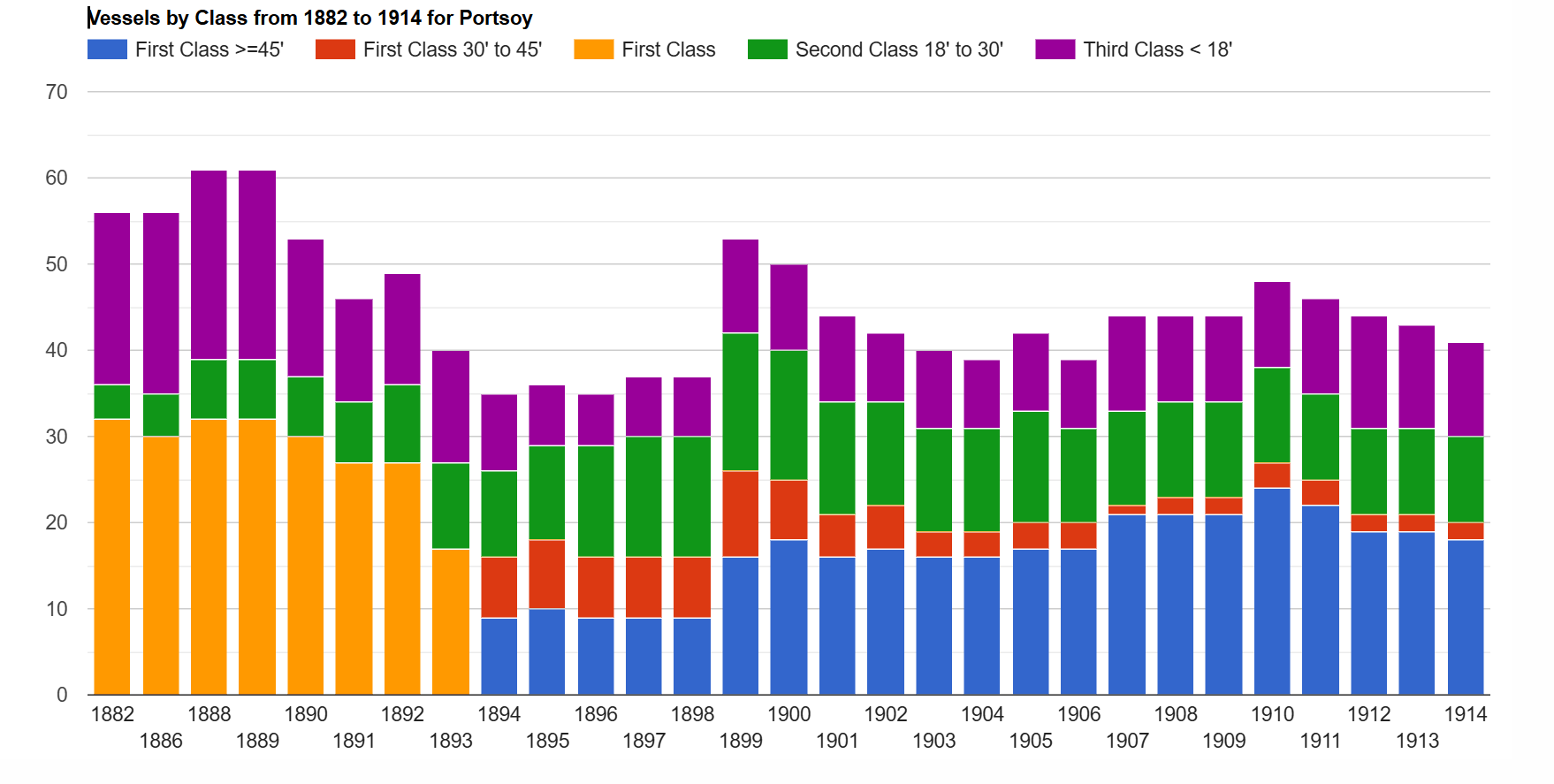
Vessels by class

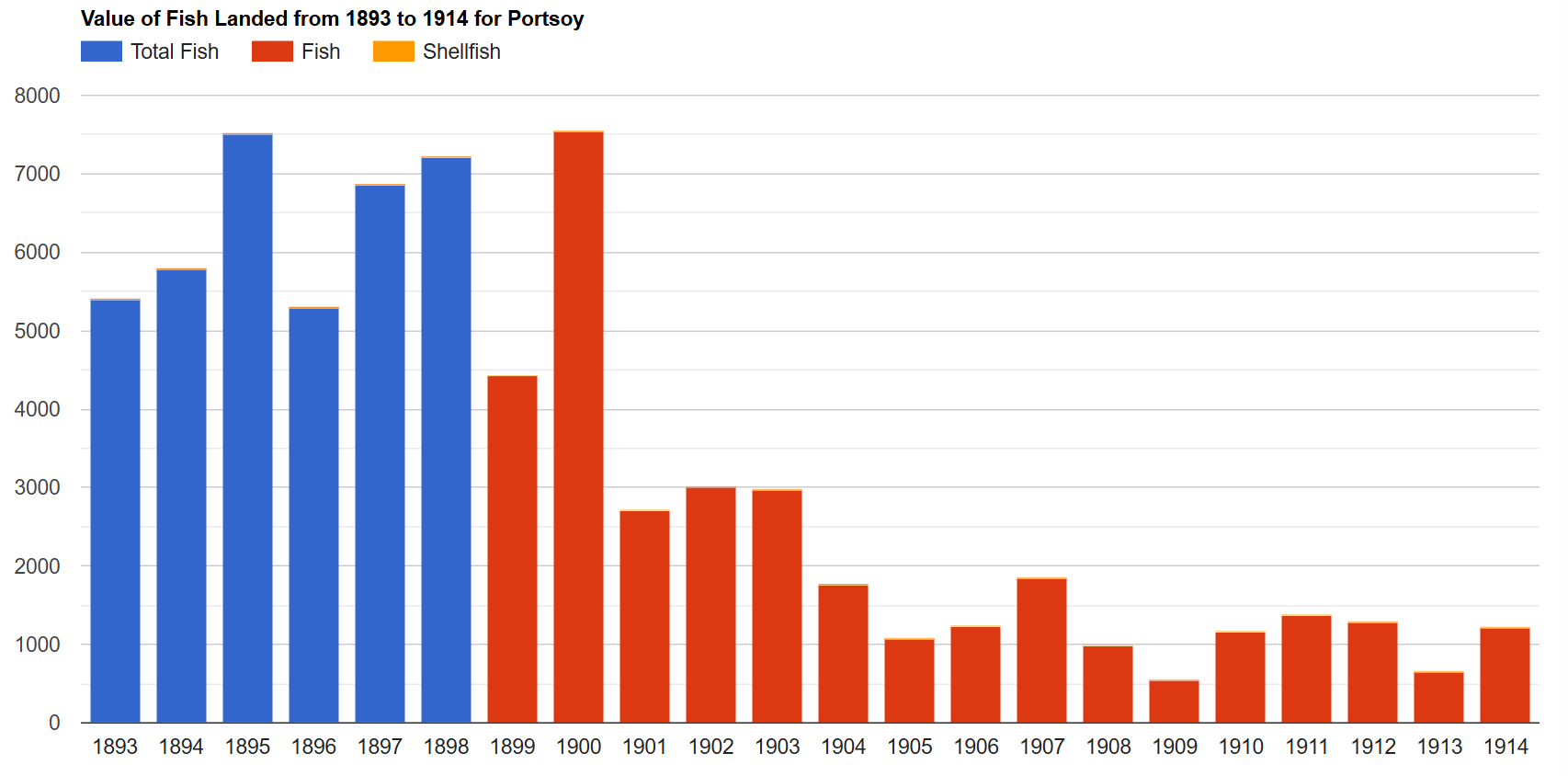
Value (£) of fish landed

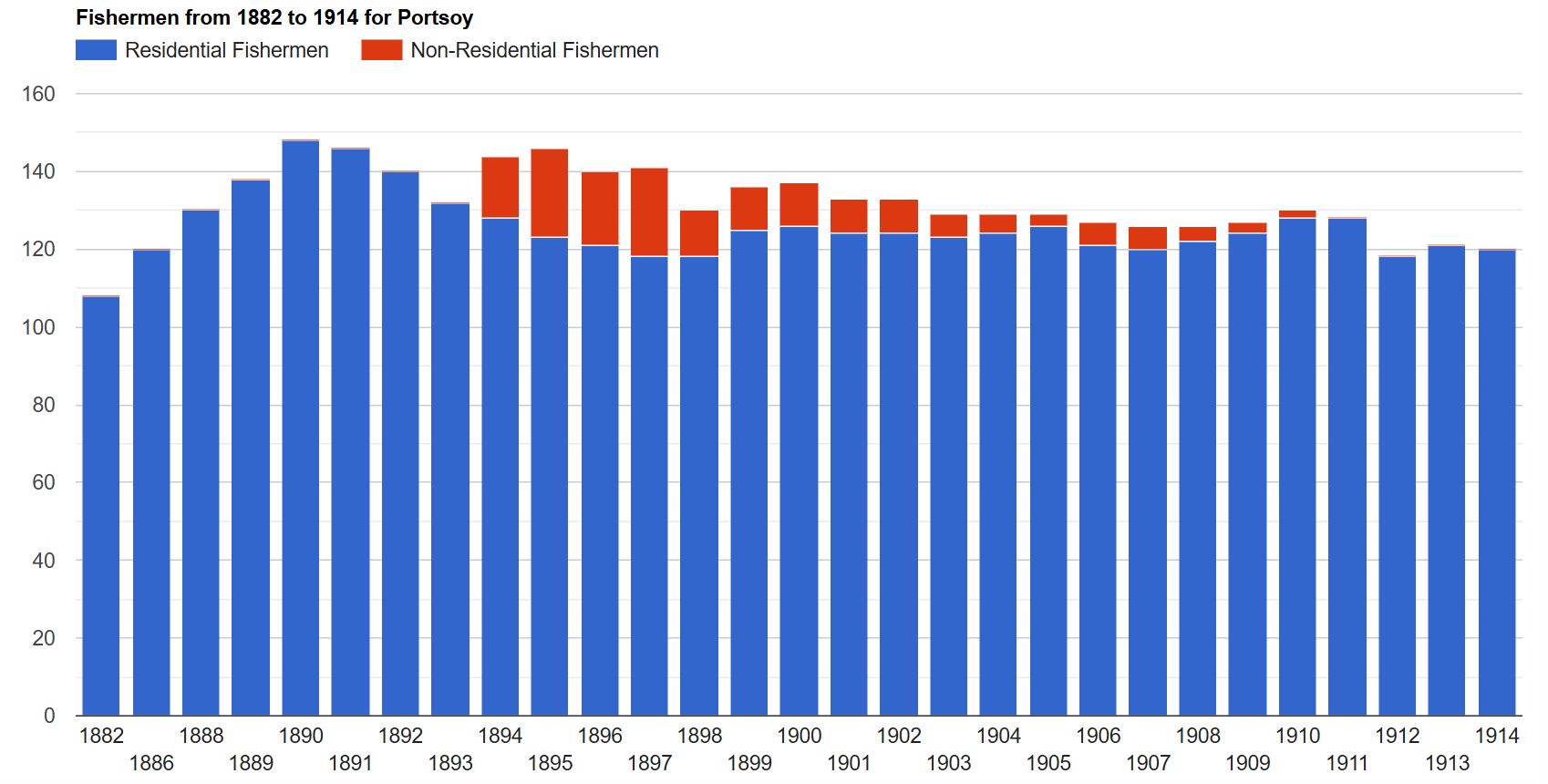
Fishermen

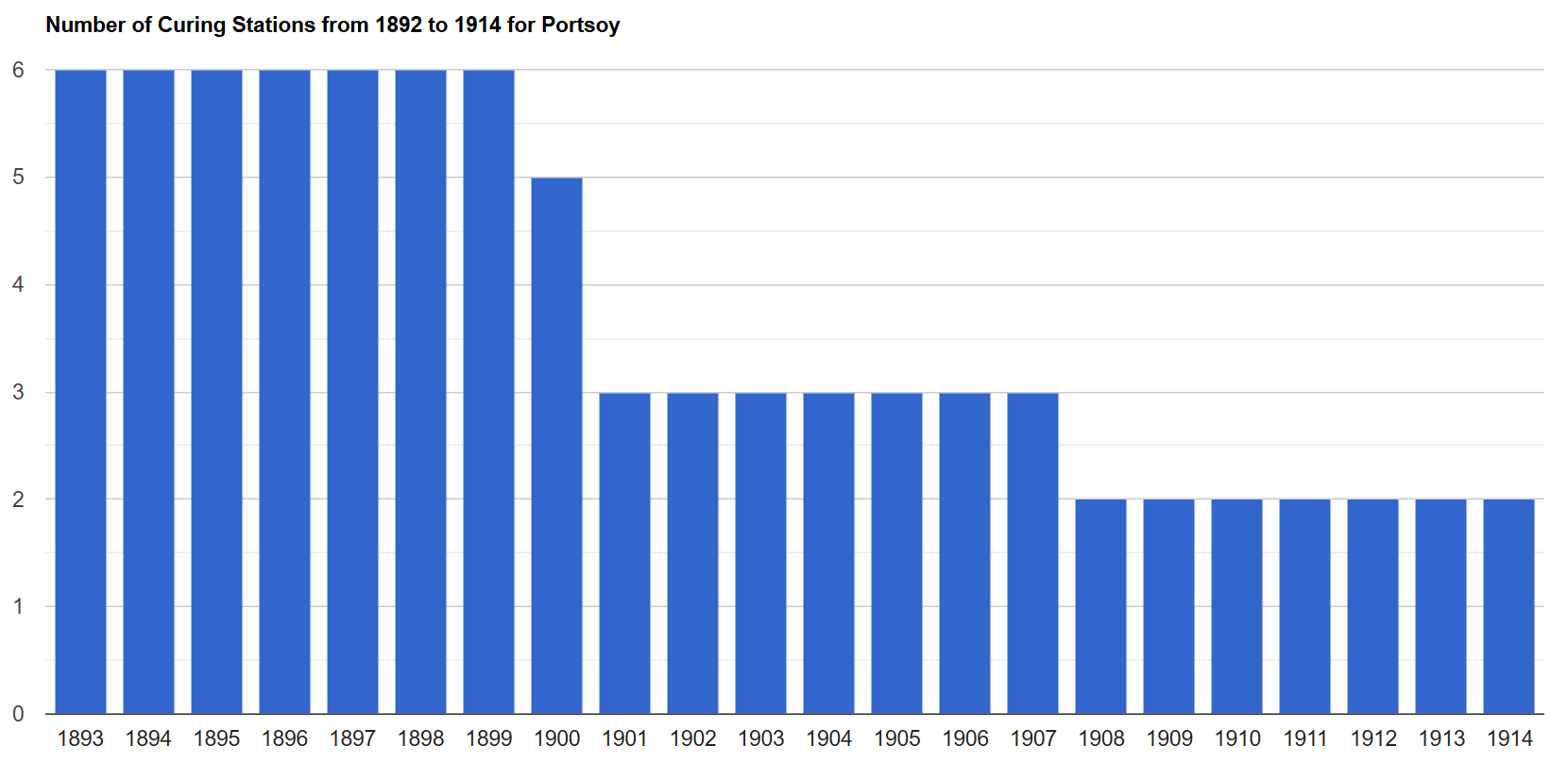
Number of curing stations

== Economy ==
Portsoy is known for local jewellery made from "Portsoy marble" (which is not marble, but rather serpentinite). The annual Scottish Traditional Boat Festival was started in 1993 to celebrate the 300th anniversary of the old harbour.

== In popular culture ==
Portsoy, notably the harbour, has featured in BBC period dramas The Camerons, The Shutter Falls and Peaky Blinders and a Tennent's Lager advert parodying the 1949 film Whisky Galore! It was also the principal location for Gillies MacKinnon's film Whisky Galore!, a 2016 remake of the 1949 film; Portsoy represented the fictional island of Todday.

== Transport ==
Portsoy railway station was formerly the terminus of the Banff, Portsoy and Strathisla Railway branch of the Great North of Scotland Railway system. It closed in 1968.

== Notable people ==
- Jimmy MacBeath, the wandering singer, was born in Portsoy and is buried there
- William Boyd, Canadian pathologist and medical textbook writer, was born in Portsoy
- Eoin Jess, the former Aberdeen and Scotland footballer, was born in Portsoy
- Jim Paterson, trombonist with Dexys Midnight Runners, was born and raised in Portsoy

== See also ==
- Shore Inn, public house dating to the mid-1700s
