= Freeport of Riga =

Port in Riga, Latvia

- Interactive map of Freeport of Riga
- Location in Latvia

Location
- Country: Latvia
- Coordinates: 56°58′48″N 24°05′34″E

Statistics
- Website www.freeportofriga.lv

Riga Free Port (Latvian: Rīgas brīvosta) is a major port on the east coast of the Baltic Sea, located in Riga, the capital of Latvia. It stretches for 15 km (9.3 mi) along both banks of the Daugava. Within the city limits, the area of the port is 1,962 ha (4,850 acres), with a water area of 6,348 ha (15,690 acres). Navigation is carried out year-round. Most of the cargo turnover is made up of transit cargo to and from the Commonwealth of Independent States (CIS). The main objects of cargo handling are coal, oil products, timber, fertilizer and container cargo. While the Ventspils Free Port and Liepaja Port specialize in export, a significant part of the activities of the Freeport of Riga is import. In the early 2000s, the goods arriving at the Riga port amounted to 70 percent of the incoming freight turnover of all the Latvian ports taken together.

In 2012, the Freeport of Riga took fourth place in overall cargo turnover among the ports of the eastern Baltic (after Primorsk, St. Petersburg and Ust-Luga) and third place in container freight turnover (after St. Petersburg and Klaipeda).

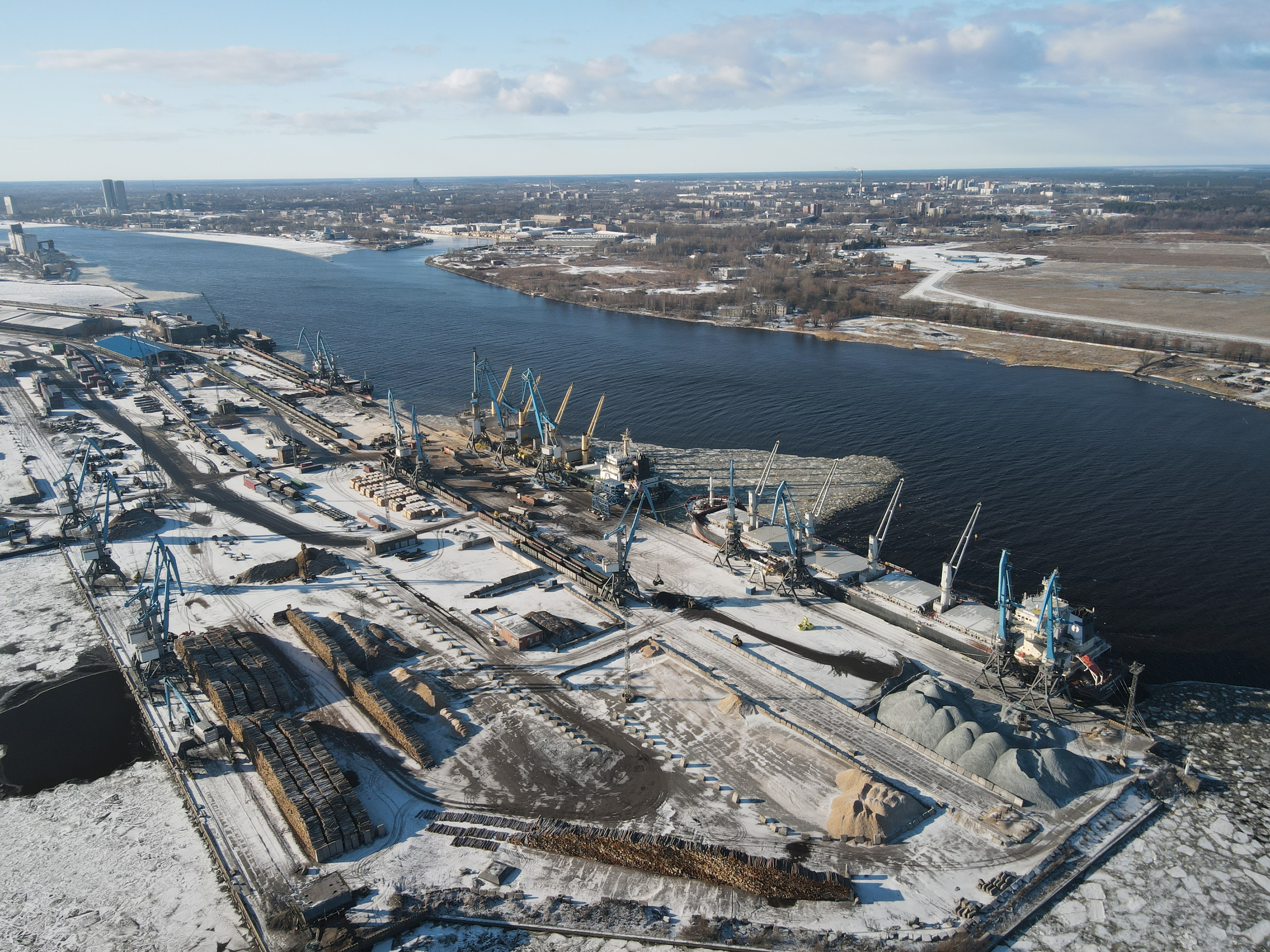
Riga free port

== History ==
Since its foundation, Riga was primarily a trading and transshipment point, so its development was directly related to maritime trade. The first harbor for settlement was the so-called Riga lake – the extension of the river Daugava.

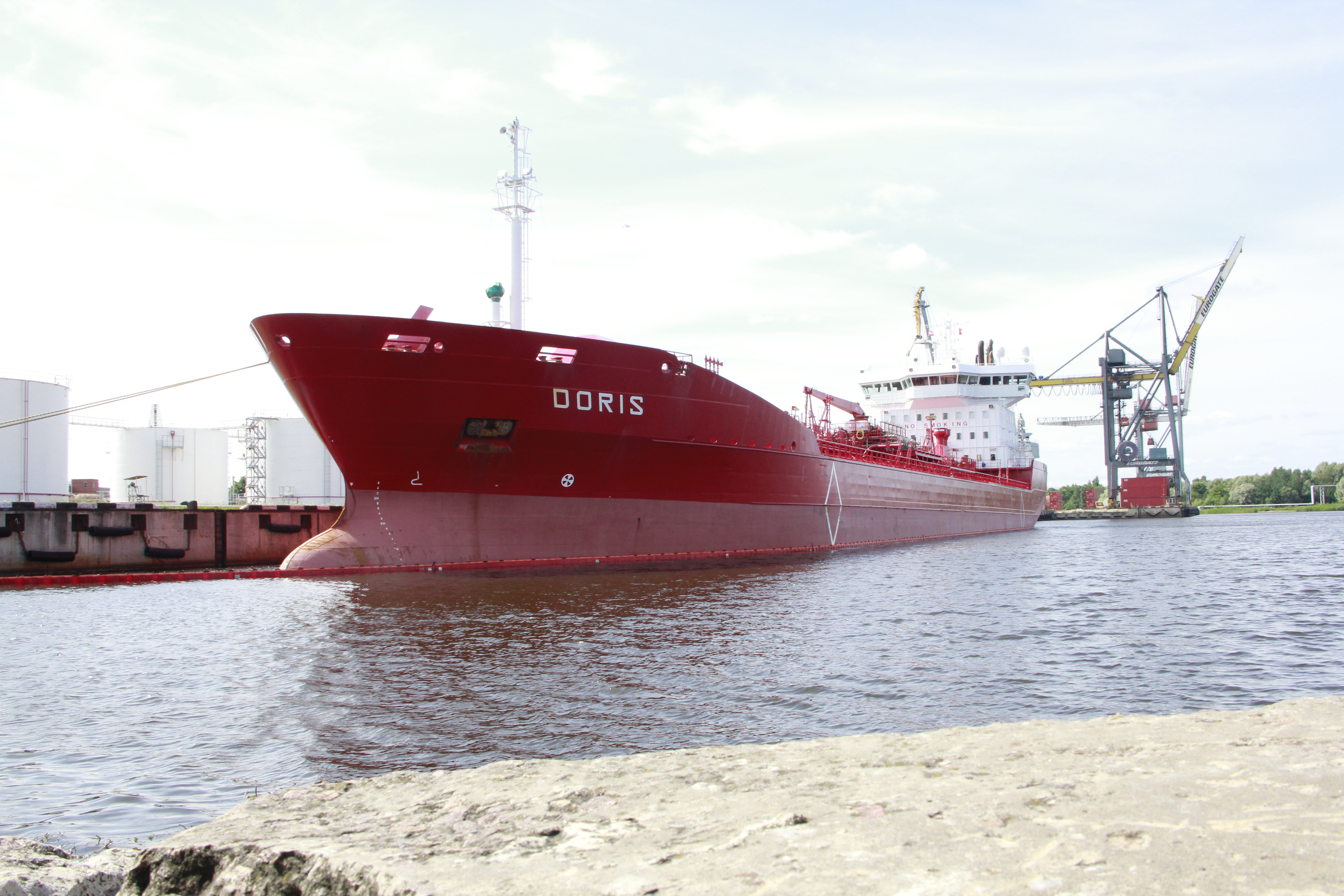
Bulk carrier merchant navy ship

In the late 15th and early 16th centuries, the city's main port moved to the Daugava. The basis of commodity turnover at this time was fabrics, metal, salt and fish. Over the next 150 years, the city passed successively into the hands of the Rzeczpospolita (1582), Sweden (1629) and Russian Empire (1721). In the Russian Empire, the port played an important role: at the beginning of the 20th century it occupied third place among the state's ports in terms of foreign trade and first in timber exports. During each of the world wars, the city fell under German occupation. Before that, the port equipment was evacuated, and some buildings were destroyed. During the years of Soviet power, the port expanded: the container terminal, built in the early 1980s on the island of Kundziņsala, at the time of commissioning was one of the largest in the USSR.

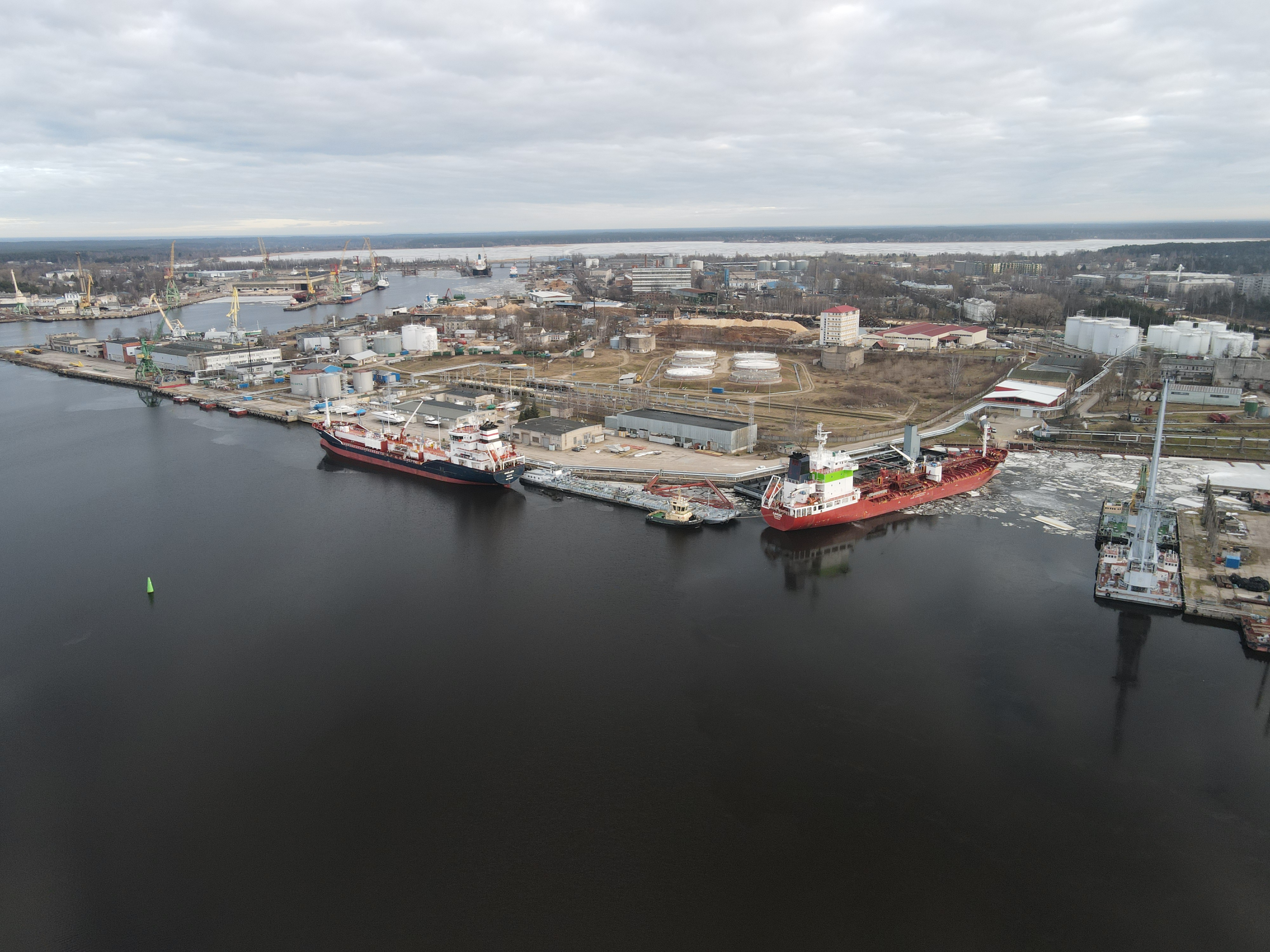
Riga port

With the arrival of Latvia's independence, the modern history of the port began.

== Port turnover ==
Year	2005	2006	2007	2008	2009	2010	2011	2012	2013	2014	2015	2016	2017	2018	2019	2020	2021	2022	2023
Port turnover, thousands tonnes	24429.1	25357.6	25932.8	29565.9	29723.4	30475.6	34072.1	36051.9	35466.7	41080.4	40055.8	37070.3	33674.7	36400	32800	23700			18790

== See also ==
- Ports of the Baltic Sea
