= Juris Kanels =

Latvian diplomat (born 1955)

Former rector of the Transport and Telecommunication Institute
- Incumbent
- Assumed office May 2021

Chairman of the Supervisory Board of Riga International Airport
- Incumbent
- Assumed office May 2016

Personal details
- Born: 1955 (age 70–71) Latvian SSR, Soviet Union
- Education: University of Latvia
- Occupation: Diplomat, academic administrator, corporate executive

Juris Kanels (born 1955) is a Latvian diplomat, academic administrator, and corporate executive. He serves as the chairman of the supervisory board of Riga International Airport and is chairman of the Transport and Telecommunication Institute (TSI) During the 1990s, he served as Latvia's Ambassador to Belgium, the Netherlands, Luxembourg, the European Union, and NATO.

== Early life and education ==
Kanels was born in 1955. In 1978, he graduated from the Faculty of Economics at the University of Latvia, specializing in industrial planning.

In 1992, he completed courses in market economics at Dalhousie University in Canada and in European Union structures and procedures through the British Council in Oxford and London. He undertook further executive education in foreign direct investment policy at the Joint Vienna Institute in 2003, strategic communication in 2004, airport planning and operations at the IATA Training and Development Institute in 2007, aviation safety management systems at the ICAO in 2008, and EASA Part 66/147 training in 2015.

In 2020, he earned a Ph.D. in political science from the University of Latvia.

== Diplomatic and public career ==
From January 1991 to January 1992, Kanels served as Deputy Director General of the Department of Foreign Economic Relations under the Cabinet of Ministers of the Republic of Latvia. In January 1992, he was appointed Director of the Economics Department and Deputy State Secretary at the Ministry of Foreign Affairs of Latvia, serving in this role until September 1993.

From September 1993 to January 1998, Kanels was Ambassador Extraordinary and Plenipotentiary of Latvia to Belgium, the Netherlands, and Luxembourg, as well as Head of the Mission of Latvia to the European Union and Representative to NATO. From January to May 1998, he served as Ambassador-at-Large for the Ministry of Foreign Affairs.

From April 2003 to October 2004, he served as chairman of the Board of the Latvian Development Agency, becoming Director of the Investment and Development Agency of Latvia (LIAA) following its reorganization. From November 2004 to November 2006, he was chairman of the Board of state agency VITA (State Information Network Agency).

Between September 2012 and September 2016, Kanels served on the Qualification Commission of the Ministry of Foreign Affairs of Latvia.

== Corporate and aviation management ==
Kanels held executive and supervisory roles across public and private sector enterprises, including Vice Chairman of the Board at SIA "Eirokonsultants" (1998–2002), board member of the Riga Region Development Agency (2002–2003), Deputy Chairman of the Council at AS "Rīgas jūras līnija" (2002–2003), board member of the Free Port of Ventspils (2003), board member of state joint-stock company "Latvijas gaisa satiksme" (2008–2009), chairman of the board at SIA "ANS" (2009–2011), and chairman of the board at SIA "Selkoms" (2009–2010).

From March 2004 to November 2006, he served as a council member of state joint-stock company Riga International Airport, subsequently serving as an executive board member from February 2007 to December 2008. From September 2007 to December 2008, he was a member of the Technical and Operational Safety Committee of ACI Europe.

In May 2016, Kanels was appointed chairman of the supervisory board of Riga International Airport. He was reappointed to the role in May 2021, and his term was extended in May 2026 pending a public competitive selection process.

== Academic career ==
Kanels joined the Transport and Telecommunication Institute (TSI) in March 2012, serving as Administrative Vice-Rector, Head of the International Relations Department, and Acting Rector. From August 2015 to May 2019, he served as Director of the TSI Academic and Professional Aviation Center (TSI/APAC).

In May 2021, he was elected Rector and board member of TSI until March 2026.

== Other activities ==
- Board Member (1998–2003) and Vice President (1998–2000) of the NGO "European Movement in Latvia".
- Board Member of the "Latvian Aviation Association" (2016–2020).
- Chairman of the Board of the Association of Private Higher Education Institutions (Privāto augstskolu asociācija, since November 2023).
