= Port of Hamina-Kotka =

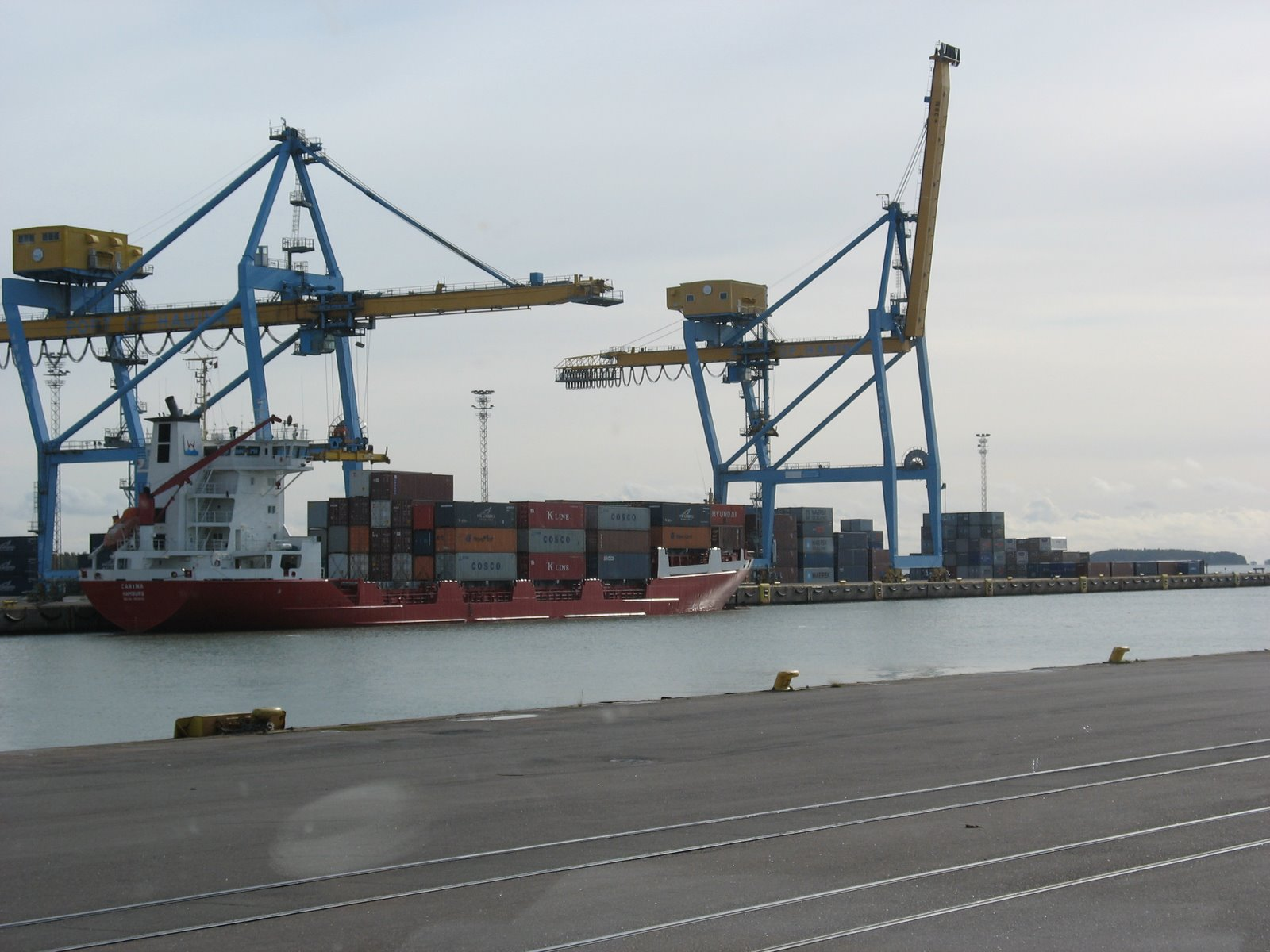
- A view to Port of Hamina

Location
- Country: Finland
- Location: Hamina, Kotka
- UN/LOCODE: FIHMN; FIKTK

Details
- Owned by: HaminaKotka Satama Oy

Statistics
- Annual cargo tonnage: 18 million (2019)
- Passenger traffic: not frequent
- Annual turnover: €45.5 million (2019)
- Website

Port of Hamina-Kotka (Finnish Hamina-Kotkan satama) is a major seaport in Kotka and Hamina in Kymenlaakso, Finland, on the northern shore of Gulf of Finland. After its creation by merging the ports of Kotka and Hamina in 2011, the Port of Hamina-Kotka has become Finland's biggest port. It serves containers, liquid and dry bulk, gas, RoRo cargo and project shipments and is important for Finnish export industries, and transit traffic to Russia. The main export goods in addition to liquid and dry bulk are paper and pulp.

The Port of Hamina-Kotka is operated by HaminaKotka Satama Oy, a limited liability company founded in 2011 owned by the towns of Kotka (60%) and Hamina (40%). It consists of six ports:

- Port of Hamina, Hamina
- Port of Mussalo, Kotka
- Hietanen, Kotka
- Hietanen Etelä (Puolanlaituri), Kotka
- Kantasatama, Kotka
- Port of Sunila, Kotka

There are frequent connections to ports of Gothenburg, Tallinn, Lübeck, Hamburg, Bremen, Amsterdam, Rotterdam, Tilbury, Hull, St. Petersburg and Antwerp.

Kotka Harbour is also a railway station and terminus of the railway between Kouvola and Kotka.

== See also ==
- Ports of the Baltic Sea
