= Bronka (port) =

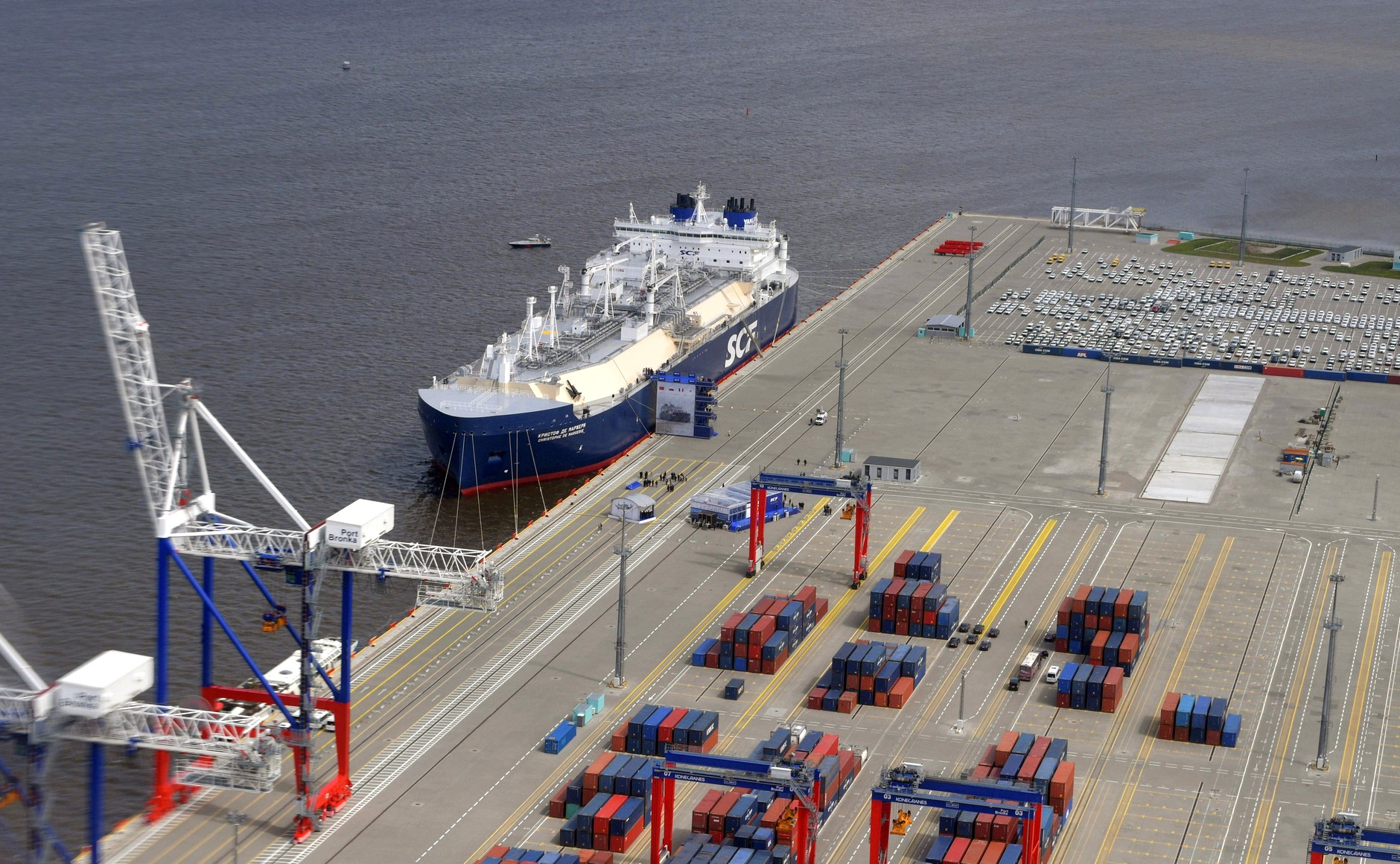
- Interactive map of Bronka
- Location within Russia

Location
- Country: Russia
- Location: St Petersburg
- Coordinates: 59°56′N 29°41′E

Details
- Opened: 2015
- Operated by: Phoenix LLC
- Owned by: Federal Agency for State Property Management
- No. of berths: 7
- Draft depth: 14.4 meters depth

Bronka is a modern port terminal in the Great Port of Saint Petersburg. It is located in the municipal town of Lomonosov on the southern coast of the Gulf of Finland. It began operations in December 2015.

Today, the Bronka port is the only deep-water terminal in the Great Port of St. Petersburg, capable of accommodating vessels up to 347 meters in length, a beam of 50 and a draft of up to 13 meters.

== Description ==
The Bronka port terminal comprises three facilities that include a container terminal, a ro-ro terminal and logistics centre. As of 2025, the Bronka port is the only deep-water terminal in the Great Port of St. Petersburg, capable of accommodating vessels up to 347 meters in length, a beam of 50 and a draft of up to 13 meters.

== Development ==
Total investments amounted to 58 billion rubles, including 15.7 billion rubles from the federal budget. The private investor and management company of the terminal is Phoenix LLC, which in April 2017 received the status of a strategic investor of St. Petersburg.
