= Vitaliy Romanchukevych =

Ukrainian banker

- Born: January 28, 1985 (age 41); Dolyna, Prykarpattia
- Education: Lviv Institute of Banking
- Occupations: Banker and Economist

Vitaliy Romanchukevych (born January 28, 1985) is a Ukrainian banker, economist who is chairman of the Board of JSC European Industrial Bank, First vice president of the Association of Ukrainian Banks (AUB) and the judge of the Arbitration Court of AUB. He previously worked at the National Bank of Ukraine for more than 10 years.

== Early life and education ==
Vitaly Romanchukevych was born on January 28, 1985, in Dolyna, Prykarpattia. Studied at Dolyna Secondary School No. 4 and Dolyna Natural and Mathematical Lyceum at the Faculty of Physics and Mathematics.

In 2007, he graduated with honors with MA in banking from the Lviv Institute of Banking, and a year earlier he got a BA degree in business economics. He also obtained a higher education in law at the correspondence department of the Lviv State University of Internal Affairs.

In December 2007 he became economist of the 1st category of the Department of Regulation of Monetary and Credit and Stock Markets of the Department of Monetary Policy of the NBU.

In 2011, he graduated from the Ukrainian Academy of Banking of the National Bank of Ukraine, specializing in "Money, Finance and Credit".

In 2012, he received the scientific degree as a candidate of economic sciences, the topic of his dissertation was "Monetary and credit policy of Ukraine in the conditions of the globalization of the economy."

In 2013, he earned a master's degree in "Social Development Management" at the Institute of Senior Managers of the National Academy of Public Administration under the President of Ukraine.

== Career ==
In 2009 Romanchukevych was appointed Chief Economist of the Department of Monetary Market Analysis and Forecasting of the General Department of Monetary and Credit Policy of the National bank of Ukraine. In 2013 He was made Deputy Head of the Department and in 2015 he was moved to head of the Department of Monetary and Credit Market Analysis. Where he stayed until 2018. During this period, in 2014, he entered doctoral studies at the University of Banking.

In 2018 Romanchukevych became First Deputy Chairman of the management board of JSC "Industrialbank", member of the management board.

In May 2019 he also became First vice-president of the Association of Ukrainian Banks.

In 2020, he defended his dissertation research on the topic "Modernization of the State Financial Policy of Sustainable Development" and received the scientific degree of Doctor of Economic Sciences. He continues to engage in scientific research, has more than 32 scientific papers.

He also studied and gained practical experience in the European Central Bank, The Central Bank of the Russian Federation in Tula, Russia, the Joint Vienna Institute, the Lee Kuan Yew School of Public Policy in Singapore, and the 2021S UCGA Board Direction. Education program in corporate governance is a joint INSEAD and UCGA project. Board Direction is therefore based upon best practices and case studies from INSEAD, London Business School and Harvard, ICA International Certificate in Compliance and in AML, Introductory Level, etc.

In December 2021 he was appointed Chairman of the Board of JSC European Industrial Bank.
