= Port of Primorsk =

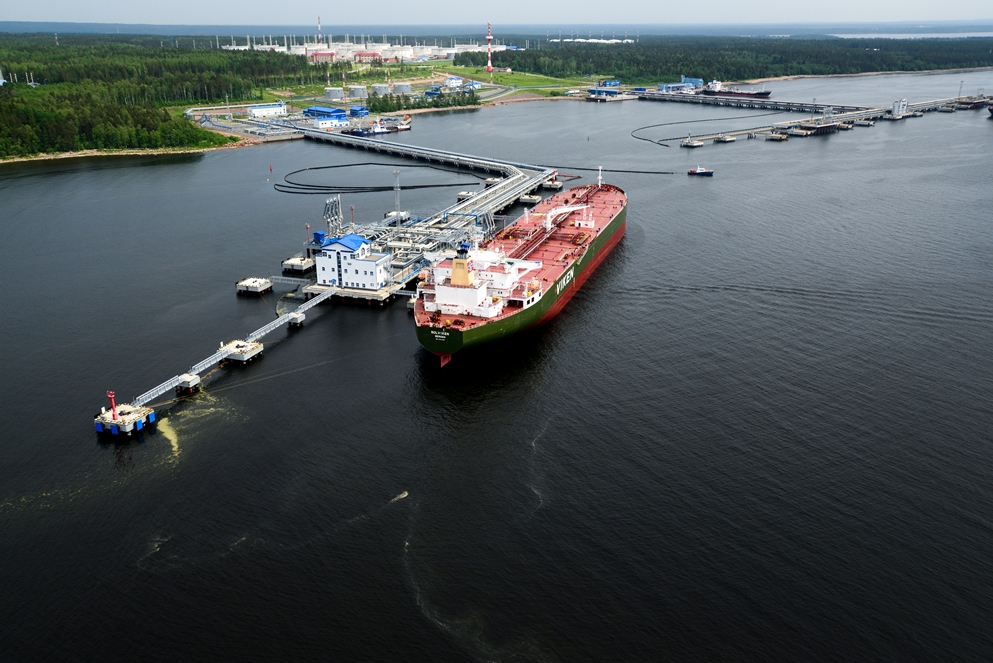
- Aerial view of the Port of Primorsk in 2014
- Interactive map of Port of Primorsk
- Location in Russia

Location
- Coordinates: 60°20′00″N 28°43′00″E

Primorsk Port (also Primorsk Commercial Sea Port) is the largest Russian oil-loading port in the Baltic Sea and the end point of the Baltic Pipeline System. The port is located on the Björkösund mainland of the Gulf of Finland in the Baltic Sea, 5km south-east from the town of Primorsk.

== History ==
In the 1980s the main part of USSR foreign trade shipments on the Baltic Sea went through the Baltic States. 25% of the total cargo turnover was from the Russian ports: Kaliningrad port, Great Port of Saint Petersburg, Vyborg port and Vysotsk port. In 1991 USSR collapsed, and Russian Federation appeared on its former territory along other new countries. 4 out of 9 USSR Baltic Ports were now on Russia’s territory, moreover, Kaliningrad port didn’t have a direct overland transport with the mainland. These ports’ capacity was not enough, and Russia had to pay other countries for using their ports and transferring cargoes on their territory (including shipments to Kaliningrad). In order to minimize the dependency on foreign harbours, in 1993 the government made a decision to build three new ports in Leningrad Oblast. One of them would become an alternative to the USSR’s biggest oil-loading port in Ventspils, Latvia.

The construction of the Primorsk oil-loading port was initiated in 2000, the first row with two docks started operating in December of 2001. Second and third started operating in 2004 and 2006 respectively, the amount of docks for tankers grew by four times. A terminal for transferring light petroleum products was opened.

=== Russian invasion of Ukraine ===
The Ukrainian army attacked the port with exploding drones in September 2025 and again in March 2026 during the Russian invasion of Ukraine. The first strike caused damage and halted oil shipments for two days. Later strike caused significant damages, long-lasting fires and 300-kilometer (186-mile) long cloud of smoke. The damages caused cancellations and delays in oil shipments. The number of casualties is unknown. In May 2026, Ukraine again launched a massive drone strike on the port. Governor Aleksandr Drozdenko said on Telegram afterwards that the drones only caused a fire that was quickly extinguished. However, Ukrainian President Volodymyr Zelenskyy disputed this, saying the strikes had caused significant damage to the port and hit an oil tanker, a small Karakurt-class corvette, and a patrol boat. Independent satellite image analysis later suggested that both a Pantsir missile system and the port itself were likely hit.

== Port characteristics ==
Port’s land area is 2,5km², its water area is 32,3km². It is equipped for handling tankers with deadweight up to 150,000 tons, 307m in length, 55m in width and 15,5m submersion; that is vessels coming from the ocean into the Baltic sea, that are close to the maximum submersion. Because of limited button depths in the Danish Straits supertankers cannot access the Baltic sea. There are 9 docks in the port, 3 of which are for port vessels; maximum depth is 18.2m at the docks. Tank vessels are handled by six azimuth tugboats: three project 16609 ones that are 2.6MW and 40 tons-force of bollard pull, two project 21110 ones, that are 4MW and 65 tons-force and a project 1233 one that is 3,7MW and 64 tons-force There are 18 storage tanks 50,000 tons each for petroleum on the site, as well as tanks for light petroleum products and a couple for emergency discharge. Total holding capacity of the tanks is 921,000 tons and 240,000 tons for light petroleum products.

== Cargo turnover ==
In millions tons. sourced through March 2012.

| | 2002 | 2003 | 2004 | 2005 | 2006 | 2007 | 2008 | 2009 | 2010 | 2011 | 2012 | 2013 | 2014 | 2015 | 2016 | 2017 | 2018 | 2019 |
| Petroleum Products | — | — | — | — | — | — | 1,56 | 4,25 | 5,81 | 5,00 | 6,52 | 9,30 | 11,3 | 14,5 | 13,7 | 13,6 | 14,9 | 13,5 |
| Petroleum | 12,4 | 17,7 | 44,6 | 57,3 | 66,1 | 74,2 | 74,0 | 74,9 | 71,7 | 70,1 | 68,2 | 54,5 | 42,4 | 45,1 | 50,7 | 44,0 | 38,5 | 47,5 |
| Total | 12,4 | 17,7 | 44,6 | 57,3 | 66,1 | 74,2 | 75,6 | 79,2 | 77,5 | 75,1 | 74,8 | 63,8 | 53,7 | 59,6 | 64,4 | 57,6 | 53,5 | 61,0 |

== See also ==
- Ports of the Baltic Sea
