= Port of Darłowo =

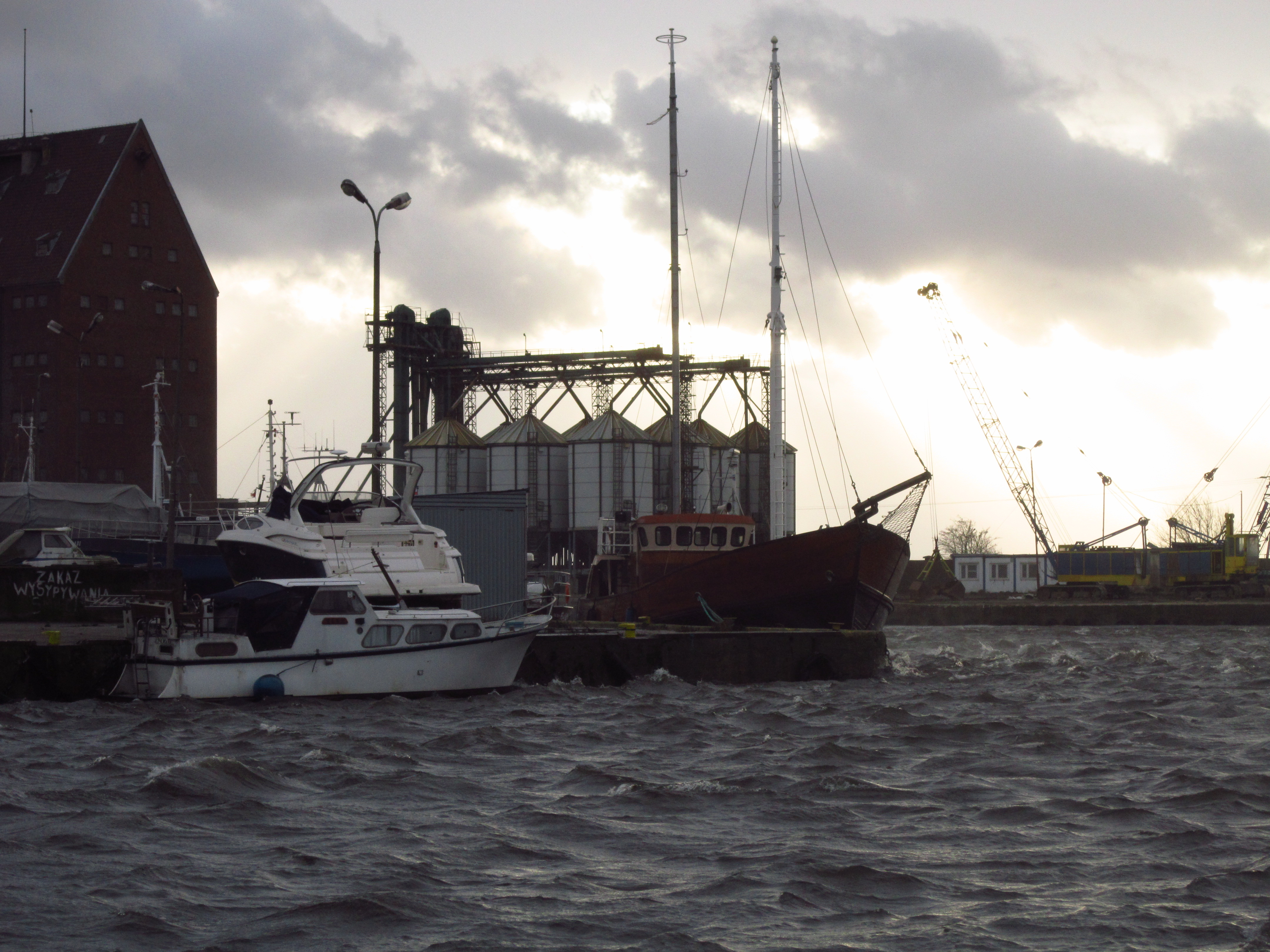
- A view of the Port of Darłowo (2013)

- The logo of Zarząd Portu Morskiego Darłowo
- Click on the map for a fullscreen view

Location
- Country: Poland
- Location: Darłowo
- Coordinates: 54°26′24″N 16°22′34″E
- UN/LOCODE: PLDAR

Details
- Opened: 1205-01-30
- Operated by: Zarząd Portu Morskiego Darłowo
- Owned by: Darłowo
- No. of wharfs: 23
- No. of piers: 1
- Draft depth: 4 m
- Ship length: 75 m

Statistics
- Annual cargo tonnage: 119,952 (2023)
- Passenger traffic: 43,638 (2019)
- Website; Zarząd Portu Morskiego Darłowo

The Port of Darłowo [darˈwɔvɔ] is a Polish seaport situated on the southern coast of the Baltic Sea called Slovincian Coast, at the mouth of river Wieprza. It is located within the northern region of West Pomeranian Voivodeship, specifically in Sławno County and the city of Darłowo.

The port facilitates domestic and foreign trade through goods transshipment. In 2023, it handled 119,952 tons of cargo.

Other activities of the harbour include: procurement, storage, processing, and sale of sea fish; ship repairs, maintenance services, and serving as a stop for vessels during inter-cruise breaks; catering to sports and recreational craft, thus contributing to regional economic and leisure activities.

Lengths of wharfs and piers
Wharf/Pier	Length [m]
Pilotowe wharf	189
Usteckie wharf	211
Wopowskie wharf	83
Dorszowe I wharf	240
Dorszowe II wharf	297
Wyposażeniowe wharf	147
Postojowe I wharf	100
Zachodnie I wharf	79
Skarpowe wharf	297
Władysławowskie wharf	265
Puckie wharf	92
Gdańskie wharf	190
Południowe wharf	45
Gdyńskie wharf	194
Szczecińskie wharf	179
Słupskie I, Słupskie II wharfs	128
Koszalińskie wharf	55
fishing pier	51
Rybackie wharf	141
Warsztatowe wharf	135
Łebskie wharf	129
Kołobrzeskie wharf	207

== Gallery ==
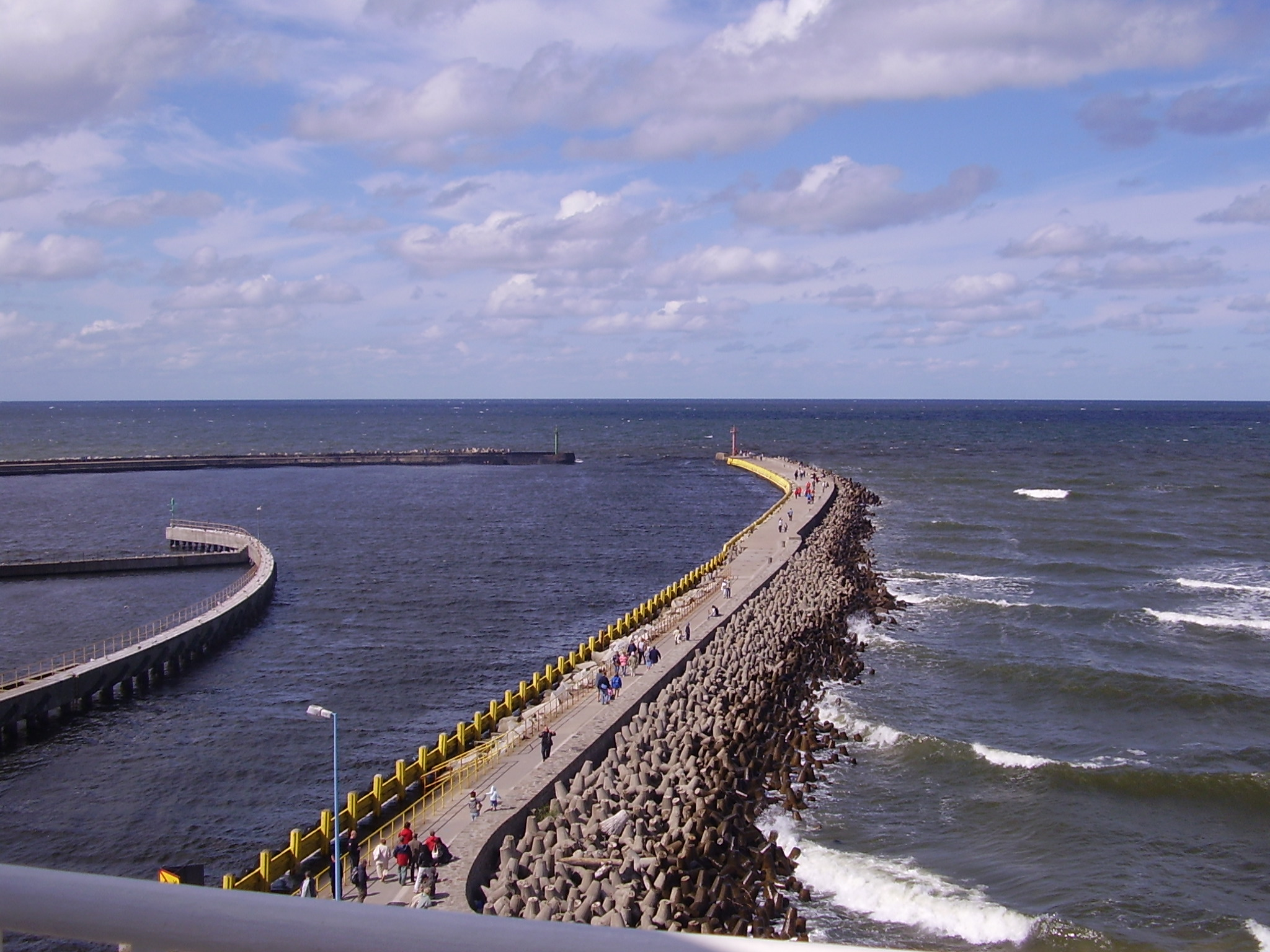
Breakwater at the mouth of river Wieprza

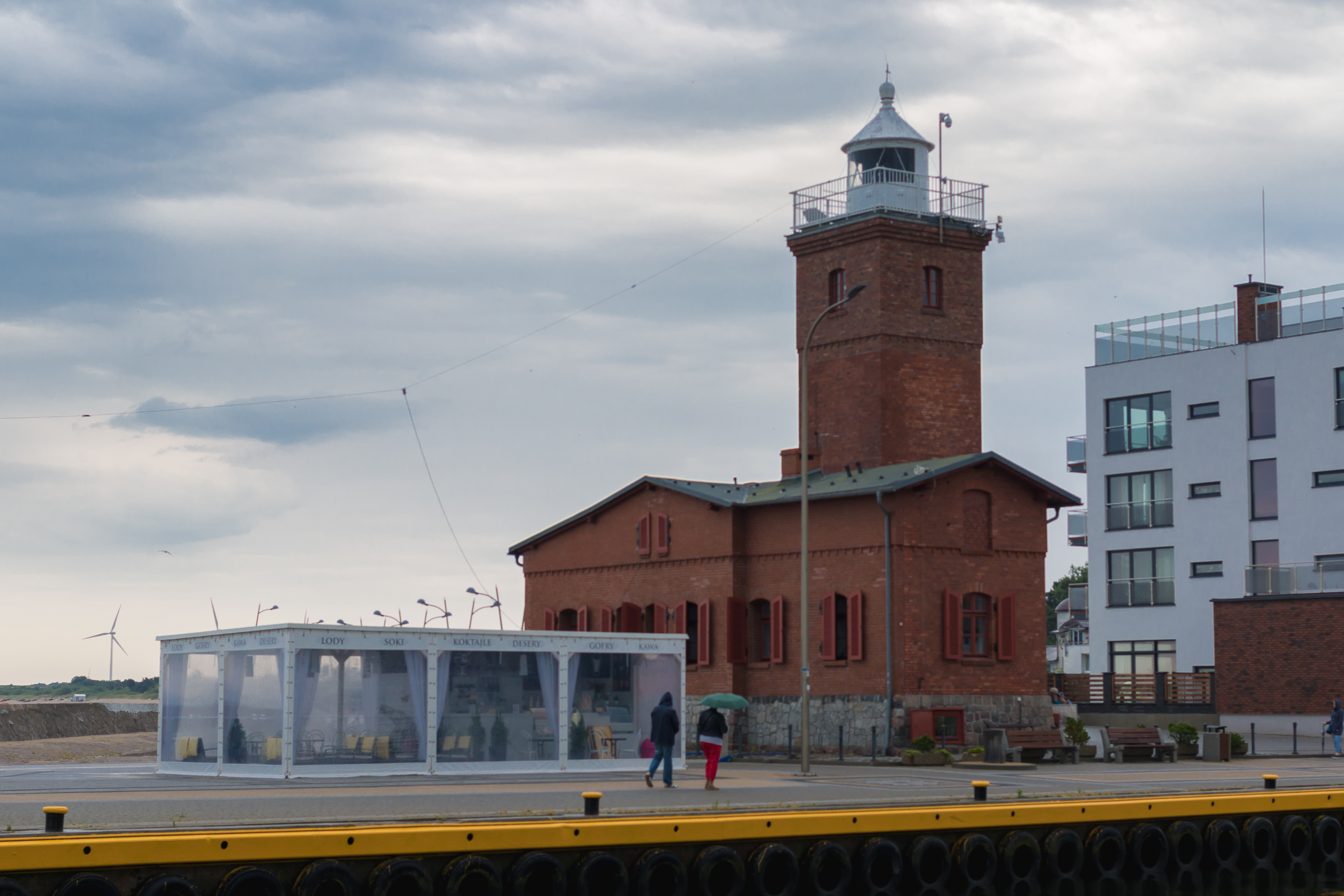
Darłowo Lighthouse

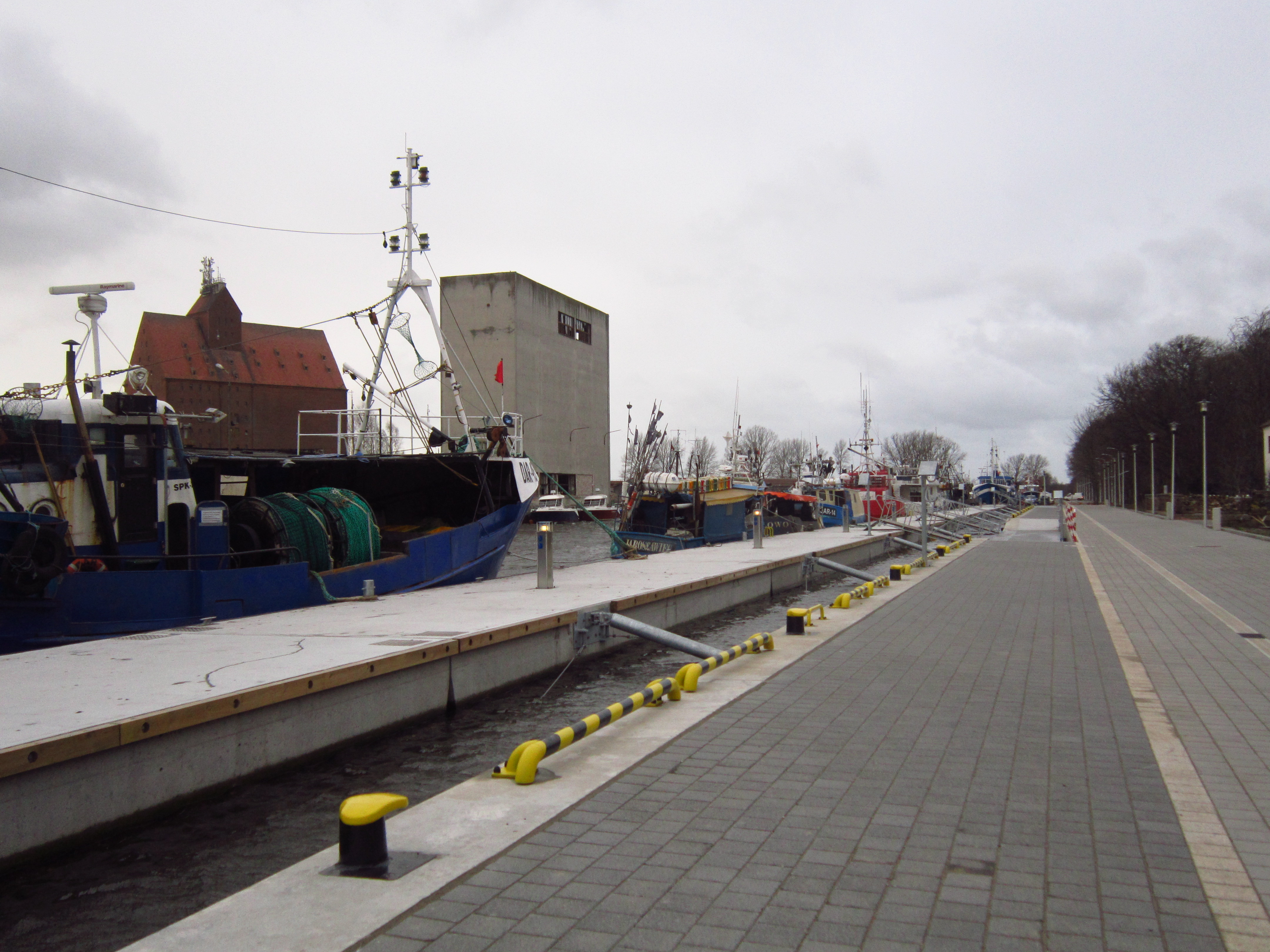

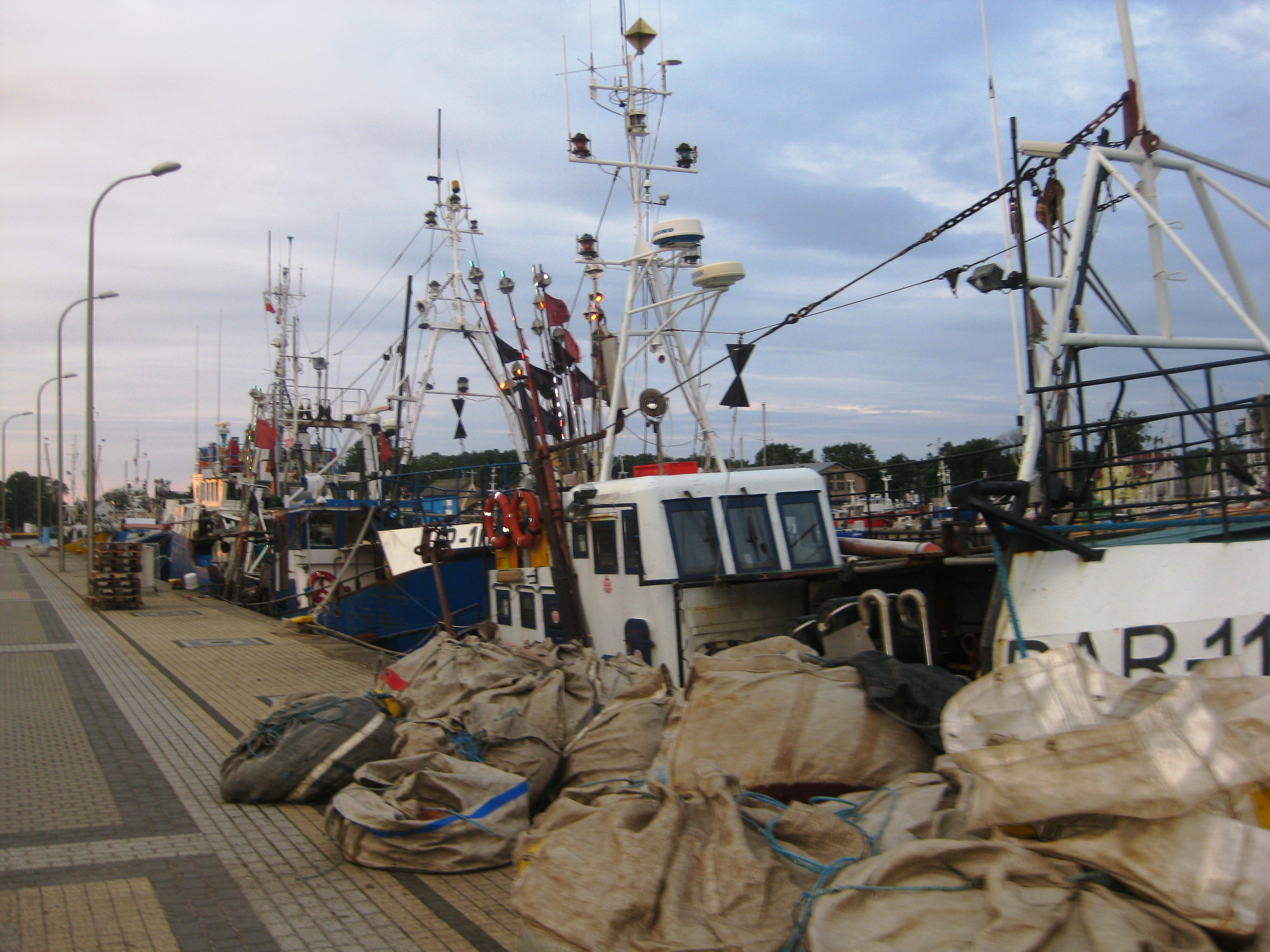

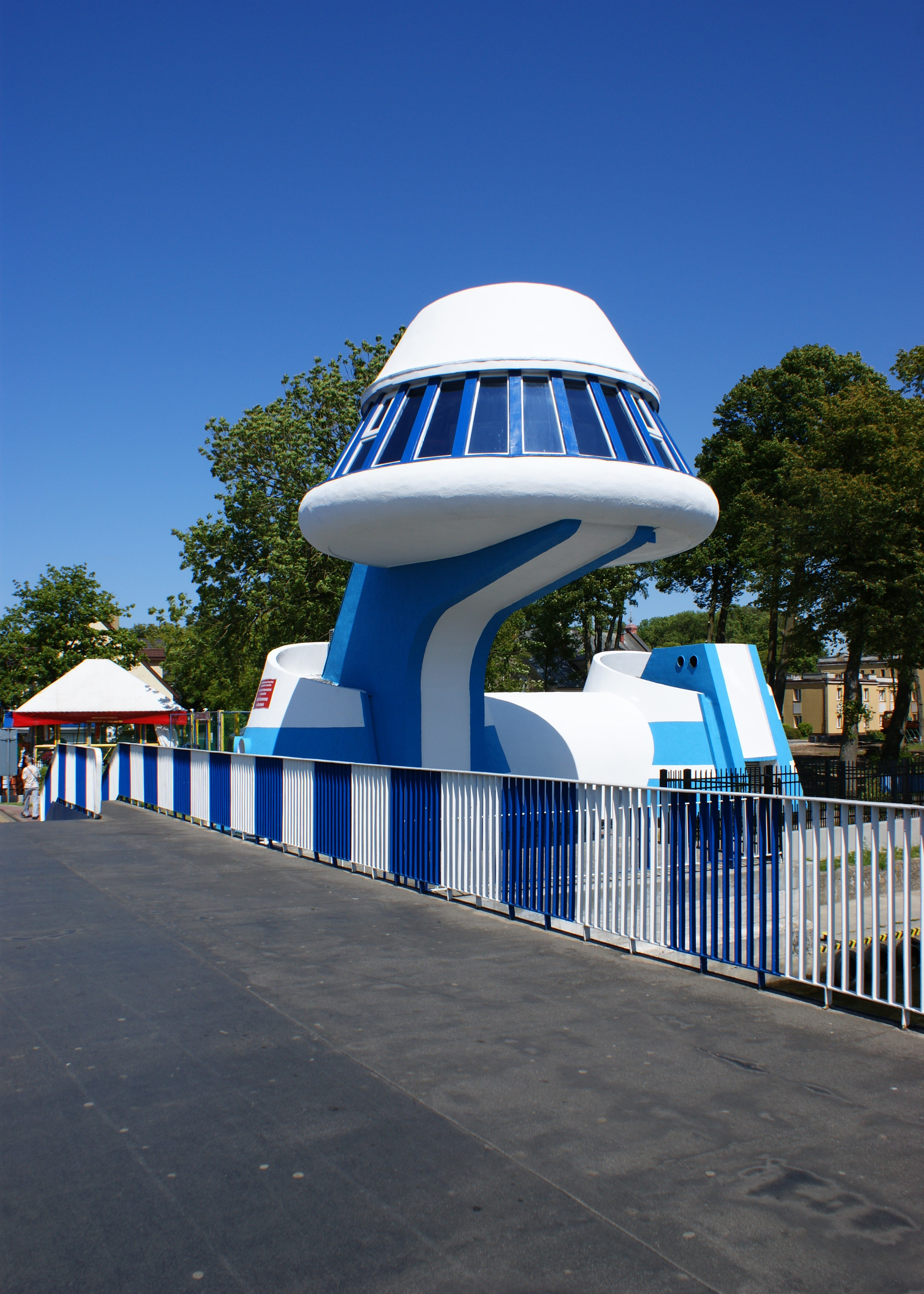
Drawbridge over river Wieprza

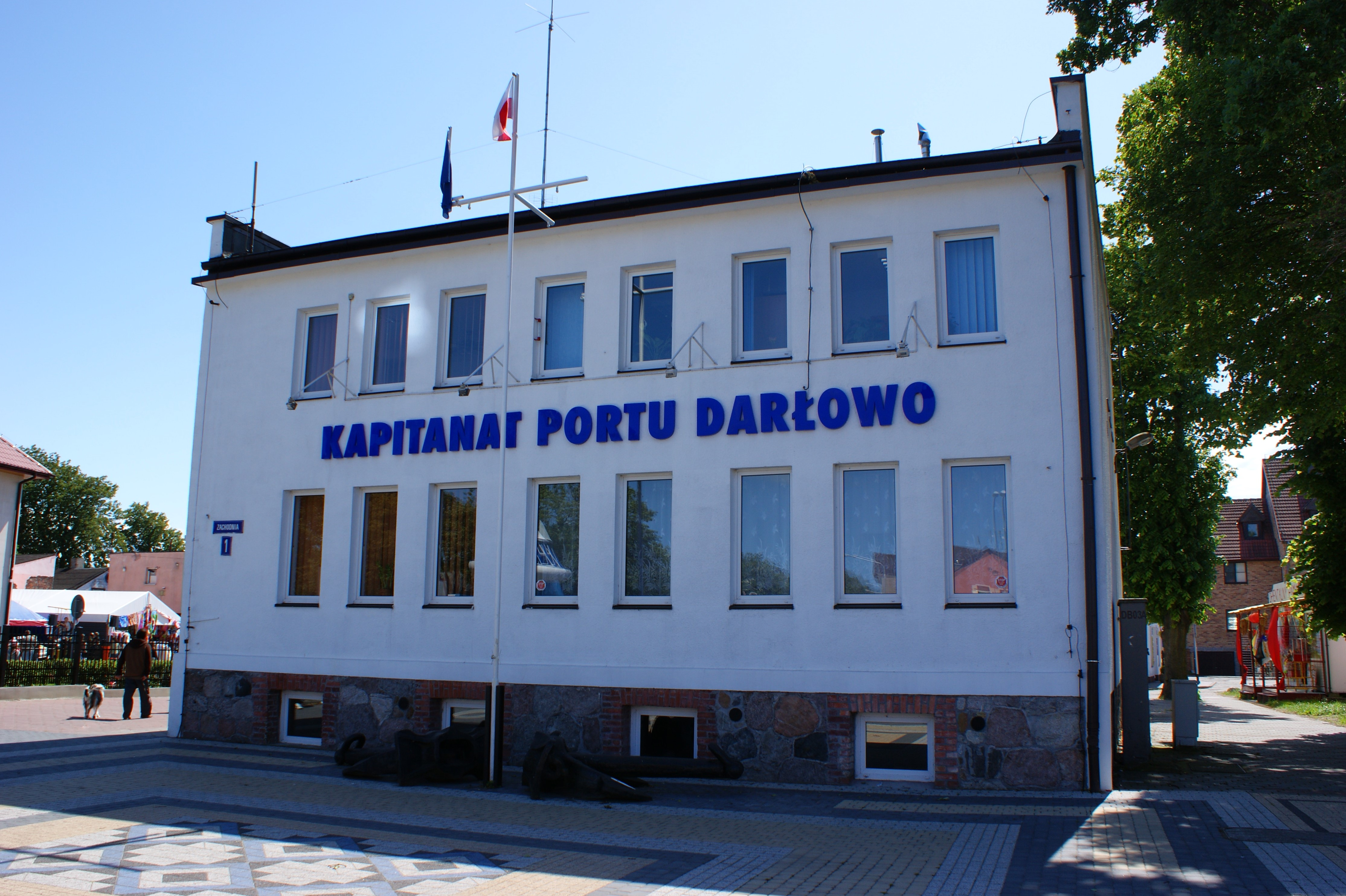
Harbour master's office

== See also ==
- Ports of the Baltic Sea
