= Rostock Port =

Seaport in Germany

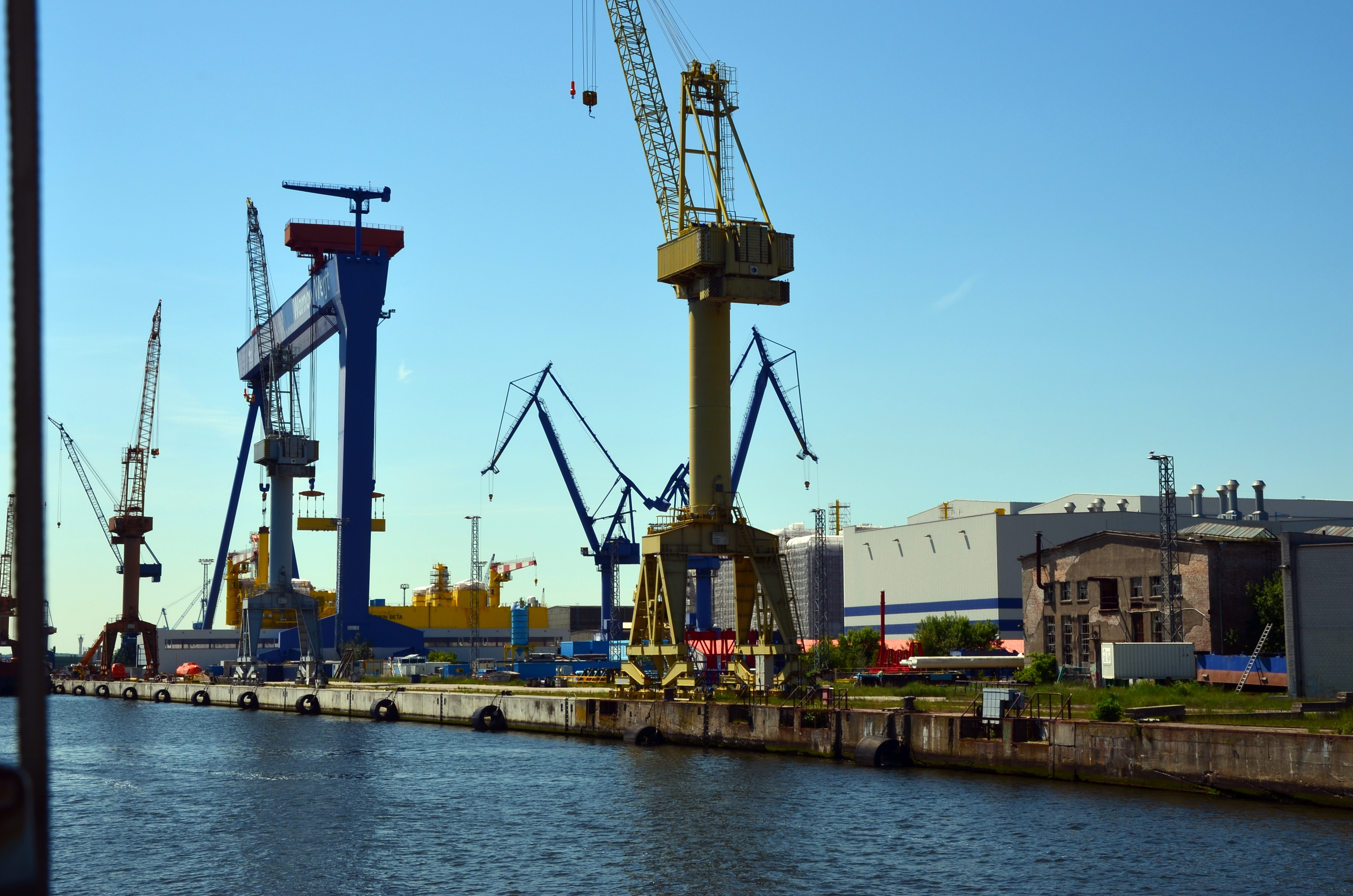
- Interactive map of Rostock Port

Location
- Country: Germany
- Location: Rostock

Details
- Owned by: Rostock Port GmbH

Statistics
- Website rostock-port.de

Rostock Port is a large German port on the Baltic Sea, it is located on the Unterwarnow estuary in the city of Rostock. Most of the port infrastructure is owned by Rostock Port GmbH (until 2016: Hafen-Entwicklungsgesellschaft Rostock mbH "HERO"), a joint venture between the state of Mecklenburg-Vorpommern (25.1%) and the Hanseatic City of Rostock (74.9%). The port operations are carried out by Euroports Germany GmbH & Co. and other private companies. With a total throughput of 28.8 million tons (2017), the ports of Rostock is the fourth largest German port (after Port of Hamburg, Ports of Bremen and Wilhelmshaven port).

The ports of Rostock include the Rostock seaport located on the east side of the Unterwarnow (built since the 1960s), the chemical port for Yara located east of it at Breitling, the independent freight and fishing port (RFH) in the west side of the Unterwarnow, the cruise terminal at the passenger quay in Warnemünde and other smaller facilities such as the Maritime Industrial Park (MAGEB) and the Quay of Alba Nord north of the RFH and the Rostock city port, where goods are handled no more.

== History ==
The history of the Rostock port goes back to the Middle Ages, especially in the days of the Hanseatic League, the port was an important hub of trade with Scandinavia and the Baltic States . With the decline of the Hanseatic League, the port lost its importance. The relocation of (world) trade to the area of the Mediterranean and the Atlantic, connected with the discovery of America and the sea route to India, led to the descent of the port. After a brief boom due to grain exports in the mid-19th century, it was only of local importance.

At the change from the 19th to the 20th century, a modest port expansion began. Under the leadership of the city and port construction director Kerner, the port was expanded to the west, the coal quay and the Haedgehafen were built. The port received the first modern port crane and crane bridges for handling coal. At the same time the construction of railway – ferry began from Warnemünde to Gedser, as part of the Copenhagen – Berlin route, which greatly improved the access to the port. In Warnemünde estuary, a channel was created as a wider and, above all, better entrance to the Rostock port.The fairway in the port was deepened to 4.1 m to 6.7 m, so that the ships common in the Baltic Sea at that time could now call at the port without any problems. In the years up to the First World War, the quays at Eschenbrücke and Kehrwieder were built to the west of the Haedgehafen. The New Land in the east of the port was planned as an expansion area for the Holzhafen and the Osthafen expansion area was prepared on the eastern bank of the Unterwarnow. The outbreak of war in August 1914 initially put an end to all expansion plans.

In the years before the Second World War, the development of the aircraft industry also gave the port an upswing, albeit a small one. As part of the Nazi government's Reich Storage Program, modern grain silos and a new oil mill were built on the Silo Peninsula in the 1930s . During the war, the Allied air raids, which were primarily aimed at the aircraft industry and the residential areas of Rostock, also hit and damaged the port.

The division of Germany made it necessary to build an efficient seaport on the Baltic Sea coast of East Germany. In 1950 Walter Ulbricht had also stated: “We examined the project of a high sea port on the Baltic coast and came to the conclusion that we should refrain from building a new high sea port because we are convinced that the time will come when the foreign trade of a democratic Germany will again Ports of Hamburg and Lübeck are available. Until then, on the basis of an agreement with the Polish government, we will use part of the Polish port of Szczecin for our deep-sea fleet.” However, this decision was quickly revised. After examining several options, the decision was made in favor of the Rostock port.

As early as 1951, the press reported on the first construction work in Rostock. "In Rostock, large excavators are at work and are creating the most powerful sea port in our republic." However, there were significant delays in construction as a result. The New Germany wrote in 1957: "So far, some of the tasks of the centrally managed industry have not been fulfilled because the cooperation with the districts has been inadequate. The involvement of the local organs was neglected. Now that is being changed. […] For example, shipping was previously planned by departments, which has led to a delay in the expansion of our deep-sea ports. Only now is there a uniform plan that corresponds to the plan for economic development in the Rostock district."

The former Logo during the GDR time.

The new port was opened on 30 April 1960 and operated by the VEB Seehafen Rostock. The port became the home port of the ships of the Deutsche Seereederei (DSR) and was able to record a steady growth in throughput until 1989, mainly through bulk cargo.

With the German reunification, a repositioning of the port was necessary. The ferry traffic to Gedser (Denmark) and Trelleborg (Sweden), temporarily also to Helsinki or Hanko (Finland), Gdynia (Poland) and the Baltic States was expanded. Roll-on/roll-off traffic also gained in importance, especially for the transport of forest products from Finland.

=== Privatisation ===
In 1996, following several years of decline in port traffic, the Rostock city council agreed to sell the port to Kent Investments Ltd., a company headed by the British politician and businessman David Young, Baron Young of Graffham. Together with two Israeli businessmen Menachem Atzmon, and Ezra Harel. It was later discovered that Lord Young was only a frontman for the Israeli investors. The two were later under investigation by Israel Securities Authority, suspected of fraud and breach of trust. They acquired the port by obtaining a loan from Rogosin Industries, a public company they controlled, which raised the money by issuing bonds. Rogosin Industries then received an option to buy 25 percent of the port in exchange for forgiving the loan. Rogosin Industries eventually exercised this option, which left Harel and Atzmon owning 75 percent of Rostock Port using Rogosin's funds. The case was investigated after Rogosin Industries defaulted on its bonds, as it run out of cash to pay its bondholders. The company later went into liquidation.

In 2012, the Rostock city council decided to buy back the port and bring it back again under public ownership

== See also ==
- Ports of the Baltic Sea
