= Kundziņsala =

Island and neighbourhood in Riga, Latvia

Coordinates: 57°10′N 24°06′E

- Neighbourhood of Riga
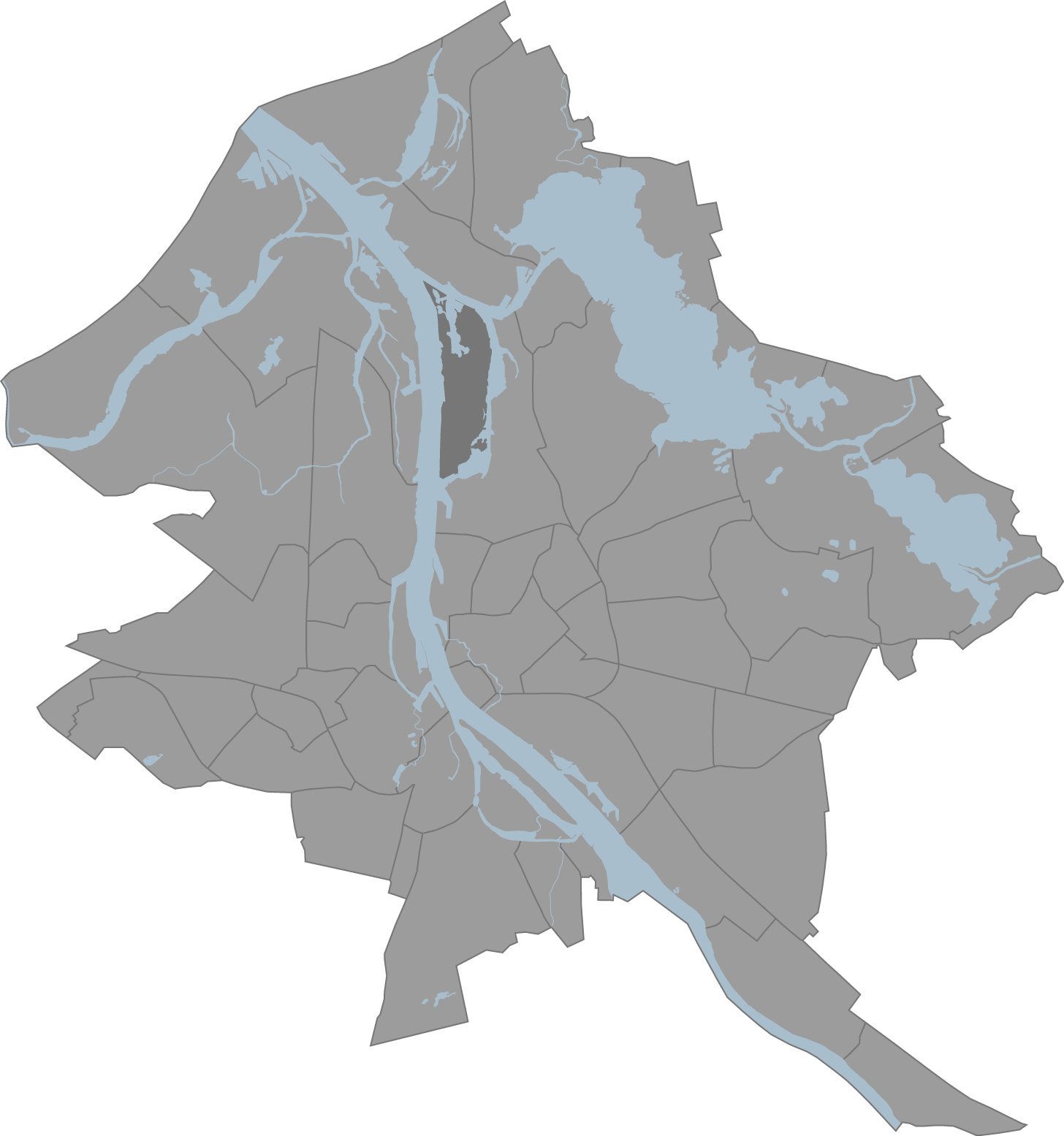
- Location of Kundziņsala in Riga
- Interactive map of Kundziņsala
- Country: Latvia
- City: Riga
- District: Northern District

Area
  - Total: 5.554 km^{2} (2.144 sq mi)

Population (2017)
  - Total: 382
  - Density: 68.8/km^{2} (178/sq mi)
- Website: apkaimes.lv

Kundziņsala is a neighbourhood of Riga in Latvia, located on an island fully enclaved within the Daugava River in Freeport. The neighbourhood is administratively part of Riga's Northern District. Kundziņsala is the largest island in Riga. It is mainly covered by an industrial area related to maritime trade. With a population of 358 as of 2021, Kundziņsala blends the feel of a small rural community with the demands of nearby industrial port activities. This mix has shaped a strong local identity influenced by both its natural surroundings and environmental challenges.

== Geography ==
Kundziņsala occupies a narrow island in the estuary of the Daugava River, immediately east of Riga's central districts but completely surrounded by fenced port territory. Historically accessible only by boat, it is now linked by a single road bridge across a narrow channel. The entire island is ringed by the Port of Riga's security fences, which residents say make the neighbourhood feel even more isolated: "You cannot get anywhere, there are fences all over". The neighbourhood's layout remains defined by its winding lanes, detached single-family homes and pockets of woodland and garden spaces that contrast sharply with the sprawling container yards and coal-handling terminals of the Freeport immediately to its west.

== Demographics ==
As of 2020, Kundziņsala's population stood at 358, making it the smallest of Riga's 58 administrative neighbourhoods. Long-term residents include fourth- and fifth-generation families whose ties to fishing and riverside livelihoods predate the island's absorption into port operations. The island's demographic profile skews towards homeowners rather than renters, reflecting its legacy as a self-contained village that has resisted large-scale redevelopment pressures.

== History ==
Prior to the mid-20th century, Kundziņsala was a fishing and boat-building community whose economy and daily life centred on the Daugava's currents. From the 1970s onwards, successive rounds of port expansion physically severed the island from the riverfront and incorporated it into the growing Freeport complex. In 1995, municipal boundaries formally placed Kundziņsala within the Freeport's jurisdiction, cementing its status as a residential enclave amid industrial zones.

== Environment ==
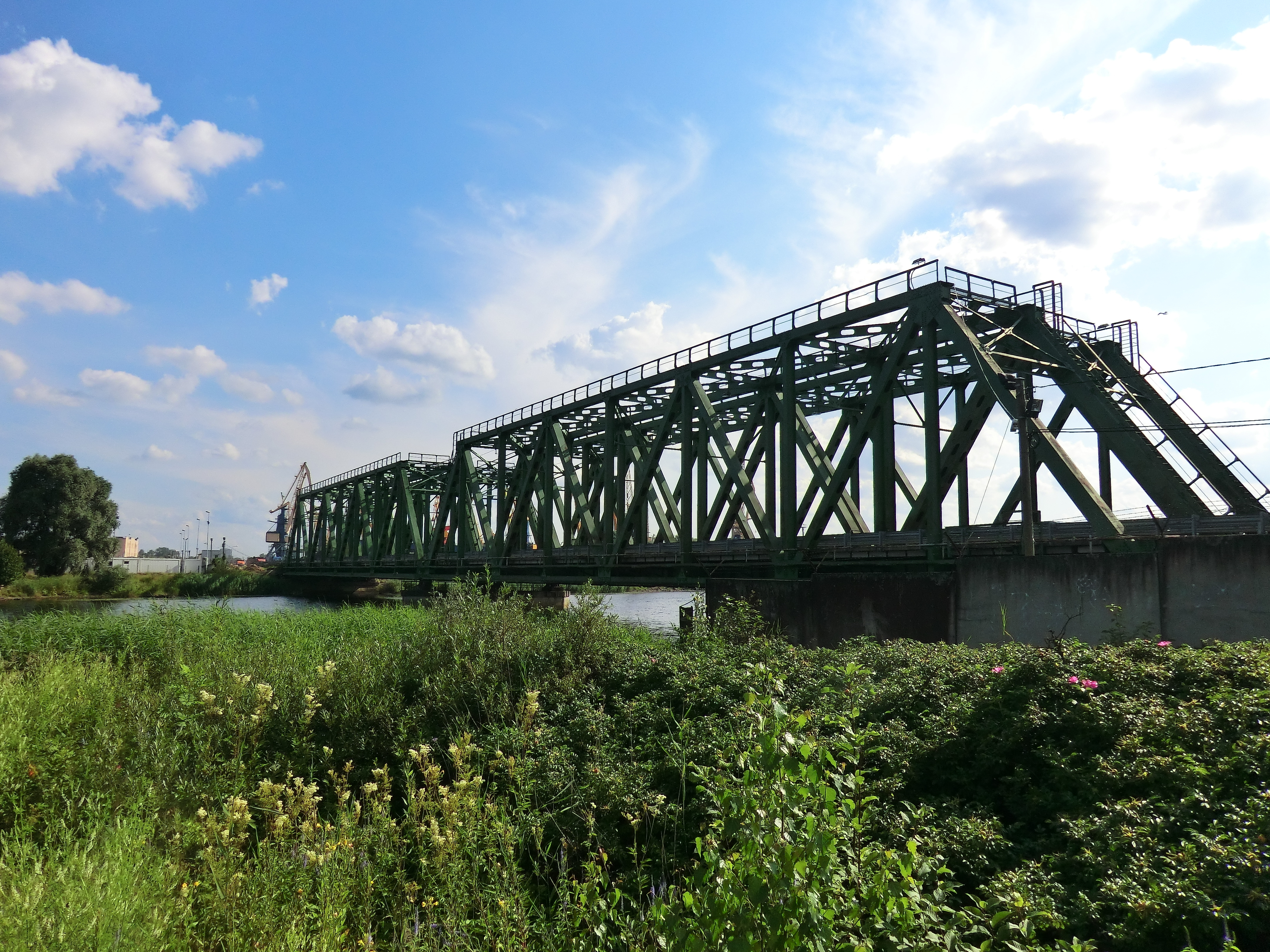
Kundzinsala bridge

Neighbourhood residents report frequent dust deposition, elevated particulate matter and intermittent odours from open coal storage and benzene emissions at nearby hydrocarbon terminals. Noise pollution from 24-hour cargo handling and heavy vehicle traffic is similarly pervasive. Despite these pressures, the abundance of surrounding green space—woodland stands and private gardens—remains the most valued environmental asset and provides a critical buffer that shapes both daily life and residents' strong attachment to place. While modern chain-link fencing allows glimpses of cargo operations, older concrete walls elsewhere remain opaque, reinforcing a sense of separation from the Daugava and limiting informal river-front access.

== Community ==
Kundziņsala retains a pronounced "island" atmosphere: neighbours describe close social ties, a rural pace of life and shared stewardship of communal spaces. Survey responses highlight that "sense of community" and the area's tranquility are key factors in why residents "feel at home" despite limited local services. Annual cultural events and an active residents' association further reinforce these bonds, compensating for the island's small size and relative isolation. In 2017, port officials and islanders planted a continuous hedge along the chain-link fence in a joint effort to soften the barrier's presence and foster dialogue between the community and the port.

== Governance ==
Although officially part of Riga municipality, Kundziņsala falls under the planning and regulatory authority of the Freeport of Riga. Residents have limited direct influence over land-use decisions, zoning or environmental standards, which are set by port and city councils. Their primary recourse is participation in public consultations and representation through a neighbourhood association, but an imbalance of stakeholder power means that economic and industrial interests often override local community priorities.
