= Ports of the Baltic Sea =

Sea ports in the Baltic Sea

The table below lists the most recent statistics for over 100 ports of the Baltic Sea, including Kattegat strait, which handle notable freight or passenger traffic.

Container traffic is given in terms of Twenty-foot equivalent units of cargo. For ferries, transport vehicles like heavy trucks are included using their full weight, while passenger cars are not counted as cargo. Containers on trucks on ferries are not counted in containers column here.

Ports of the Baltic Sea by annual cargo tonnage
Port	Country	City/Cities	Tons		Containers TEU		Passengers	
Port	Country	City/Cities	Number	Year	Number	Year	Number	Year
Port of Ust-Luga	Russia	Ust-Luga	130,500,000	2025	—N/a			
Port of Gdańsk	Poland	Gdańsk	80,400,000	2025	2,769,000	2025	171,000	2025
Port of Primorsk	Russia	Primorsk	63,900,000	2025	—N/a			
Port of Saint Petersburg	Russia	Saint Petersburg	54,600,000	2025	—N/a			
Port of Klaipėda	Lithuania	Klaipėda	39,000,000	2025	1,309,000	2025	76,620	2025
Port of Szczecin-Świnoujście	Poland	Szczecin, Świnoujście	32,305,600	2024	67,592	2023	1,079,315	2024
Port of Rostock	Germany	Rostock	30,100,000	2023	3,530	2023	2,570,000	2024
Port of Gdynia	Poland	Gdynia	26,895,000	2024	974,586	2024	760,661	2024
Port of Porvoo	Finland	Porvoo	19,282,834	2023	—N/a			
Port of Riga	Latvia	Riga	18,794,400	2023	465,391	2023	81,681	2023
Port of Lübeck	Germany	Lübeck	15,508,584	2023	100,775	2023	437,728	2022
Port of Tallinn	Estonia	Tallinn	13,134,000	2024	261,822	2024	8,362,574	2024
Port of Hamina-Kotka	Finland	Hamina, Kotka	12,601,095	2023	561,577	2023	13,512	2023
Port of Helsinki	Finland	Helsinki	12,364,646	2023	407,995	2023	8,442,649	2023
Port of Trelleborg	Sweden	Trelleborg	12,332,000	2023	—N/a		1,711,937	2023
Port of Vysotsk	Russia	Vysotsk	11,600,000	2025	—N/a			
Port of Ventspils	Latvia	Ventspils	10,417,000	2023	11,520	2022	289,900	2022
Port of Rødbyhavn	Denmark	Rødbyhavn	9,409,000	2023	—N/a		4,722,000	2023
Port of Kiel	Germany	Kiel	7,898,906	2023	18,819	2023	2,824,318	2023
Port of Luleå	Sweden	Luleå	7,880,000	2023	—N/a		444	2023
Port of Copenhagen	Denmark	Copenhagen	7,235,000	2023	—N/a		665,000	2023
Port of Liepāja	Latvia	Liepāja	7,232,200	2023	38,900	2023	87,886	2023
Port of Stockholm	Sweden	Stockholm	7,220,000	2023	49,262	2023	7,393,778	2023
Port of Fredericia	Denmark	Fredericia	6,960,000	2023	—N/a			
Port of Malmö	Sweden	Malmö	6,850,000	2022	25,620	2022	247,721	2022
Port of Puttgarden	Germany	Puttgarden	5,764,603	2023	—N/a		4,917,000	2022
Port of Raahe	Finland	Raahe	5,109,597	2023	158	2023	—N/a	
Port of Helsingør	Denmark	Helsingør	4,967,000	2023	—N/a		6,352,000	2023
Port of Karlshamn	Sweden	Karlshamn	4,777,000	2023	522	2023	200,521	2023
Port of Rauma	Finland	Rauma	4,724,127	2023	209,875	2023	—N/a	
Port of Sillamäe	Estonia	Sillamäe	4,306,755	2023	—N/a			
Port of Gävle	Sweden	Gävle	4,194,000	2023	188,404	2023	—N/a	
Port of Hanko	Finland	Hanko	4,115,439	2023	53,524	2023	13,679	2023
Port of Oxelösund	Sweden	Oxelösund	4,068,000	2023	6,457	2023	—N/a	
Port of Skælskør	Denmark	Skælskør	3,181,000	2023	—N/a		164,000	2023
Port of Norrköping	Sweden	Norrköping	3,131,000	2023	90,876	2023	—N/a	
Port of Kokkola	Finland	Kokkola	2,795,204	2023	10,802	2023	—N/a	
Port of Tornio	Finland	Tornio	2,776,543	2023	11,318	2023	—N/a	
Port of Ystad	Sweden	Ystad	2,693,000	2023	—N/a		2,424,889	2023
Port of Naantali	Finland	Naantali	2,508,301	2023	—N/a		193,836	2023
Port of Wismar	Germany	Wismar	2,427,474	2023	—N/a			
Port of Pori	Finland	Pori	2,422,139	2023	104	2023	—N/a	
Port of Ingå	Finland	Ingå	2,312,903	2023	—N/a			
Port of Odense	Denmark	Odense	2,289,000	2023	—N/a			
Port of Aabenraa	Denmark	Aabenraa	2,165,000	2023	—N/a			
Port of Gedser	Denmark	Gedser	2,048,000	2023	—N/a		1,670,000	2023
Port of Køge	Denmark	Køge	1,982,000	2023	—N/a		77,000	2023
Port of Holmsund	Sweden	Holmsund	1,914,000	2022	3,969	2022	249,776	2022
Port of Karlskrona	Sweden	Karlskrona	1,868,000	2023	—N/a			
Port of Västerås	Sweden	Västerås	1,857,000	2023	16,421	2023	—N/a	
Port of Skellefteå	Sweden	Skellefteå	1,817,000	2023	1,774	2023	—N/a	
Port of Piteå	Sweden	Piteå	1,812,000	2023	2,201	2023	—N/a	
Port of Paldiski	Estonia	Paldiski	1,728,000	2021	—N/a			
Port of Pärnu	Estonia	Pärnu	1,716,628	2023	—N/a			
Port of Uusikaupunki	Finland	Uusikaupunki	1,630,959	2023	488	2023	—N/a	
Port of Husum	Sweden	Husum	1,569,000	2023	—N/a			
Port of Kunda	Estonia	Kunda	1,558,234	2023	—N/a			
Port of Turku	Finland	Turku	1,505,697	2023	2,794	2023	1,790,899	2023
Port of Sundsvall	Sweden	Sundsvall	1,504,000	2023	484	2023	1,108	2023
Port of Rønne	Denmark	Rønne	1,198,000	2023	—N/a		1,994,000	2023
Port of Oulu	Finland	Oulu	1,183,670	2023	21,766	2023	—N/a	
Port of Sassnitz	Germany	Sassnitz	1,150,896	2023	—N/a		5	2023
Port of Vyborg	Russia	Vyborg	1,082,800	2021	—N/a			
Port of Oskarshamn	Sweden	Oskarshamn	1,081,000	2023	127	2023	420,216	2023
Port of Police	Poland	Police	1,067,100	2024	116	2021	—N/a	
Port of Kaliningrad	Russia	Kaliningrad	1,064,820	2022	—N/a			
Port of Jakobstad	Finland	Jakobstad	1,023,260	2023	109	2023	—N/a	
Port of Mönsterås	Sweden	Mönsterås	981,000	2022	—N/a			
Port of Kalmar	Sweden	Kalmar	920,000	2023	—N/a		475	2023
Port of Köping	Sweden	Köping	918,000	2023	—N/a			
Port of Stralsund	Germany	Stralsund	879,875	2023	—N/a			
Port of Lubmin	Germany	Lubmin	841,015	2023	—N/a			
Port of Vaasa	Finland	Vaasa	816,470	2023	—N/a		263,717	2023
Port of Storugns	Sweden	—N/a	805,000	2023	—N/a			
Port of Hargshamn	Sweden	Hargshamn	794,000	2022	—N/a			
Port of Kemi	Finland	Kemi	753,076	2023	4,405	2023	885	2023
Port of Visby	Sweden	Visby	560,000	2023	—N/a		1,705,480	2023
Port of Kaskinen	Finland	Kaskinen	543,872	2023	—N/a			
Port of Rendsburg	Germany	Rendsburg	352,600	2023	—N/a			
Port of Förby	Finland	Förby	351,181	2023	—N/a			
Port of Rahja	Finland	Rahja	291,874	2023	—N/a			
Port of Pargas	Finland	Pargas	259,736	2023	—N/a			
Port of Darłowo	Poland	Darłowo	243,975	2025	—N/a		43,638	2019
Port of Flensburg	Germany	Flensburg	241,275	2023	24	2023	—N/a	
Port of Eurajoki	Finland	Eurajoki	238,539	2023	—N/a			
Port of Kołobrzeg	Poland	Kołobrzeg	222,600	2024	—N/a		290,000	2022
Port of Kantvik	Finland	Kantvik	212,274	2023	—N/a			
Port of Wolgast	Germany	Wolgast	193,623	2023	—N/a			
Port of Tolkkinen	Finland	Tolkkinen	135,774	2023	—N/a			
Port of Åhus	Sweden	Åhus	95,000	2023	12,468	2023	—N/a	
Port of Pohjankuru	Finland	Pohjankuru	90,619	2023	—N/a			
Port of Färjsund	Finland	Färjsund	79,253	2023	—N/a			
Port of Ustka	Poland	Ustka	53,700	2024	—N/a		12	2021
Port of Kristinestad	Finland	Kristinestad	51,121	2023	—N/a			
Port of Eckerö	Finland	Eckerö	49,524	2023	—N/a		1,019,133	2023
Port of Mariehamn	Finland	Mariehamn	39,352	2023	—N/a		675,979	2023
Port of Stepnica	Poland	Stepnica	38,000	2022	—N/a			
Port of Dalsbruk	Finland	Dalsbruk	32,572	2023	—N/a			
Port of Hel	Poland	Hel	30,281	2023	—N/a		207,616	2024
Port of Kimitoön	Finland	Kimitoön	29,647	2023	—N/a			
Port of Sipoo	Finland	Sipoo	27,224	2023	—N/a			
Port of Simpevarp	Sweden	Simpevarp	13,000	2022	190	2022	—N/a	
Port of Elbląg	Poland	Elbląg	12,500	2024	—N/a		34,898	2024
Port of Nexø	Denmark	Nexø	11,000	2023	—N/a			
Port of Långnäs	Finland	Lumparland	4,209	2023	—N/a		13,900	2023
Port of Skogby	Finland	Skogby	1,735	2022	—N/a			
Port of Trzebież	Poland	Trzebież	1,218	2019	—N/a		224	2024
Port of Korpo	Finland	Pargas	435	2022	—N/a			
Port of Lubin	Poland	Lubin	239	2019	—N/a			
Port of Łeba	Poland	Łeba	172	2022	—N/a		36,262	2022
Port of Władysławowo	Poland	Władysławowo	140	2024	—N/a		976	2024
Port of Dźwirzyno	Poland	Dźwirzyno	40	2020	—N/a			
Port of Rowy	Poland	Rowy	12	2022	—N/a		6,406	2022
Port of Wolin	Poland	Wolin	1	2019	—N/a		1,019	2019
Port of Jastarnia	Poland	Jastarnia	1	2017	—N/a			
Port of Nowa Pasłęka	Poland	Nowa Pasłęka	1	2017	—N/a			
Port of Dziwnów	Poland	Dziwnów	1	2020	—N/a			
Port of Mrzeżyno	Poland	Mrzeżyno	1	2020	—N/a			
Port of Sopot	Poland	Sopot	—N/a				97,049	2024
Port of Krynica Morska	Poland	Krynica Morska	—N/a				61,960	2024
Port of Västervik	Sweden	Västervik	—N/a				54,103	2022
Port of Frombork	Poland	Frombork	—N/a				52,884	2024
Port of Międzyzdroje	Poland	Międzyzdroje	—N/a				34,173	2024
Port of Härnösand	Sweden	Härnösand	—N/a				9,984	2023
Port of Nowe Warpno	Poland	Nowe Warpno	—N/a				598	2024
Port of Örnsköldsvik	Sweden	Örnsköldsvik	—N/a				319	2023

== See also ==
- List of busiest ports in Europe
