= Port of Pärnu =

Port in Pärnu, Estonia

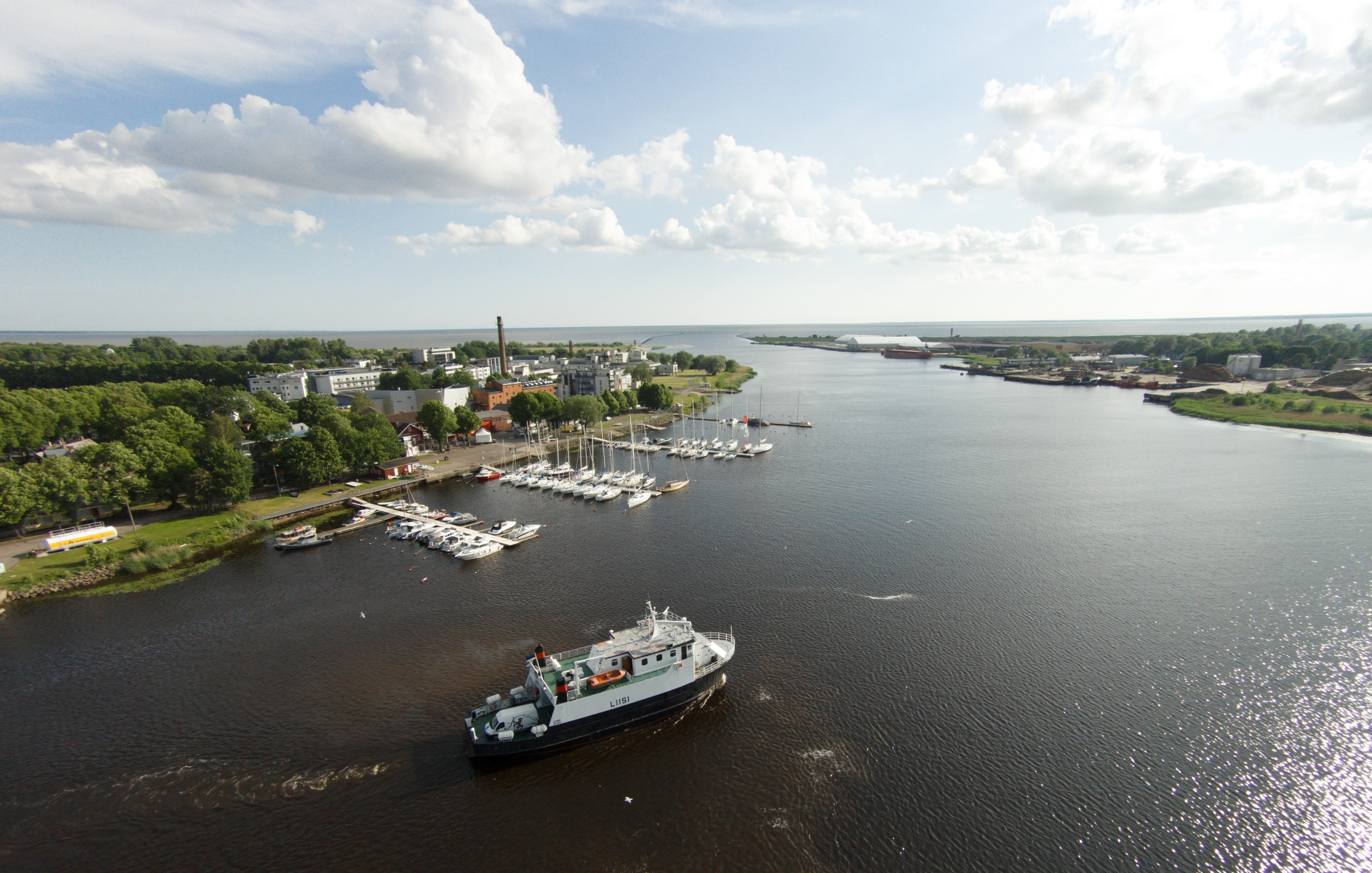
- Port of Pärnu
- Click on the map for a fullscreen view

Location
- Country: Estonia
- Location: Pärnu
- Coordinates: 58°23′00″N 24°28′48″E

Details
- Operated by: AS Pärnu Sadam

Statistics
- Website parnusadam.eu

Port of Pärnu (Estonian: Pärnu sadam) is a port in Pärnu, Estonia. The port is located on both side of Pärnu River.

The first mention of the port dates back in 13th century. The flourishing of port started at the end of 18th century and at the beginning of 19th century. The main exports of the port being timber and flax.

In modern times, the port has regular cruises between Kihnu and Ruhnu.

== Mole of Pärnu ==
To protect the port area, the Mole of Pärnu (Pärnu Breakwaters) was built. The total length of two breakwaters is 5 km. The breakwaters were built in 1863–1864.

== See also ==
- Ports of the Baltic Sea
