= Transport and Telecommunication Institute =

Higher education institution in Riga, Latvia

- Transporta un Sakaru Institūts
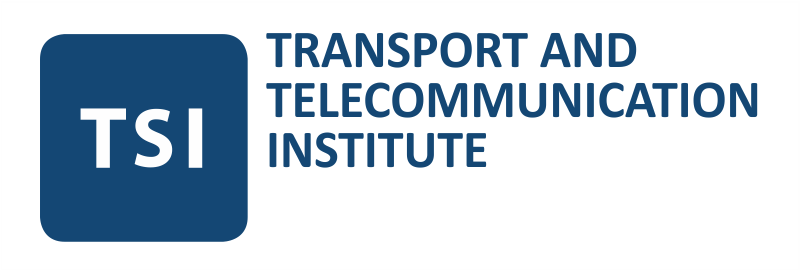
- Type: Private
- Established: 1919; 106 years ago
- Rector: Juris Kanels
- Students: 7500 graduates, 3000 students (2016)
- Address: Lomonosov street 1, Riga, Latvia, LV-1019, Riga, Latvia; 56°56′21″N 24°09′22″E
- Website: www.tsi.lv

Transport and Telecommunication Institute (TTI) (Latvian: Transporta un Sakaru Institūts, TSI) (Russian: Институт Транспорта и Связи, ИТС) (previously known as RCAII and Riga Aviation University) is the largest university-type accredited non-state technical higher educational and scientific establishment in Riga, the capital of Latvia. It was established in 1999, although it also incorporates the core of a technical and aviation school which dates back to 1919. Main directions of academic activities include electronics and telecommunications, information technology and computer science, economics, management and business administration, transport and logistics.

== History ==
=== Prehistory ===
The School of Aviation Mechanical Technicians was founded in Kiev, on May 24, 1919. The aircraft repair shops and pilot school were used as the school base. From Kiev, the school had been evacuated to Moscow and in 1921 it was relocated to Petrograd and renamed as Advanced Training Courses for Engineering Staff.

In 1938–39, a status of this educational establishment was changed due to the prevailing number of students and listeners raising the level of their skills. In May 1938 the courses were given a new name of First Aircraft Maintenance School. The school was renamed yet again in 1939. In 1946 it was reorganized as the First Leningrad Higher Military Aviation Engineering School.

=== Relocation to Latvia ===
In June 1945 the school was relocated to Riga. In Riga, also the Second Leningrad Higher Military Aviation Engineering School was functioning that had been reorganized from the technical school with similar name. Both schools had two faculties. The first was for engineering and special electrical equipment, the second was for radio engineering and air armaments. In 1949 the schools merged to form Riga Higher Military Aviation Engineering School. In June 1960 the school was broken up and on its base the civil higher school was founded, the Riga Civil Air Fleet Engineers Institute. In 1967 in connection with the reorganization of the Main Directorate of Civil Air Fleet into the Ministry of Civil Aviation, the higher school was named as the Riga Civil Aviation Engineers Institute (RIIGA). On 25 February 1992, the RIIGA passed under the jurisdiction of the Latvian Republic and changed its name to the Riga Aviation Institute. By its 80th anniversary the RAU was the largest higher school in Latvia holding a third place in the ranking of the educational establishments in the country.

=== Founding of the current institute ===
At the end of the 1990s the higher school faced a number of internal and external problems, and in August 1999 the Cabinet of Latvia made a decision about the liquidation of the RAU as the governmental higher school. Such wording encouraged its employees to reorganize this educational establishment by now into a non-governmental institution. On 6 September 1999, the joint stock company "Riga Aviation University" had been registered and from October of the same year it was renamed into the Transport and Telecommunication Institute. TTI has been included into the Training Directory of the International Civil Aviation Organization (ICAO).

== Study programmes ==
- Master's degree study programmes:
  - Master of Social Sciences in Economics
  - Master of Social Sciences in Management Science
  - Master of Engineering Sciences in Electronics
  - Master of Natural Sciences in Computer Science
  - Master of Engineering Science in "Management of Information Systems"
  - Master of Transport and Logistics
- Bachelor's degree study programmes:
  - Economics
  - Management science
  - Electronics
  - Telecommunication systems and computer networks
  - Computer science
  - Engineering science (commercial transport operation)
  - Aviation Transport
- Higher professional study programmes (II level)
  - Electronics
  - Transport and business logistics
  - Transport management
- Higher professional study programme (I level)
  - Technical maintenance of aviation transport

== Faculties ==
The institute is divided into several faculties, including:

- Faculty of Computer Science and Electronics
  - Mathematical methods
  - Computer networks
  - Electronics
  - Telecommunications
- Faculty of Management Sciences, Economics and Transport
  - Management
  - Economics
  - Transportation technology and logistics
  - Social sciences and law
- Department of Continuing Education
- Department of Basic Sciences
  - Mathematics
  - Physics
  - Linguistics
- Telematics and Logistics Institute
- Leadership Institute
- Latgale branch
