= Primorsk, Leningrad Oblast =

Town in Leningrad Oblast, Russia

Primorsk Приморск
- Town
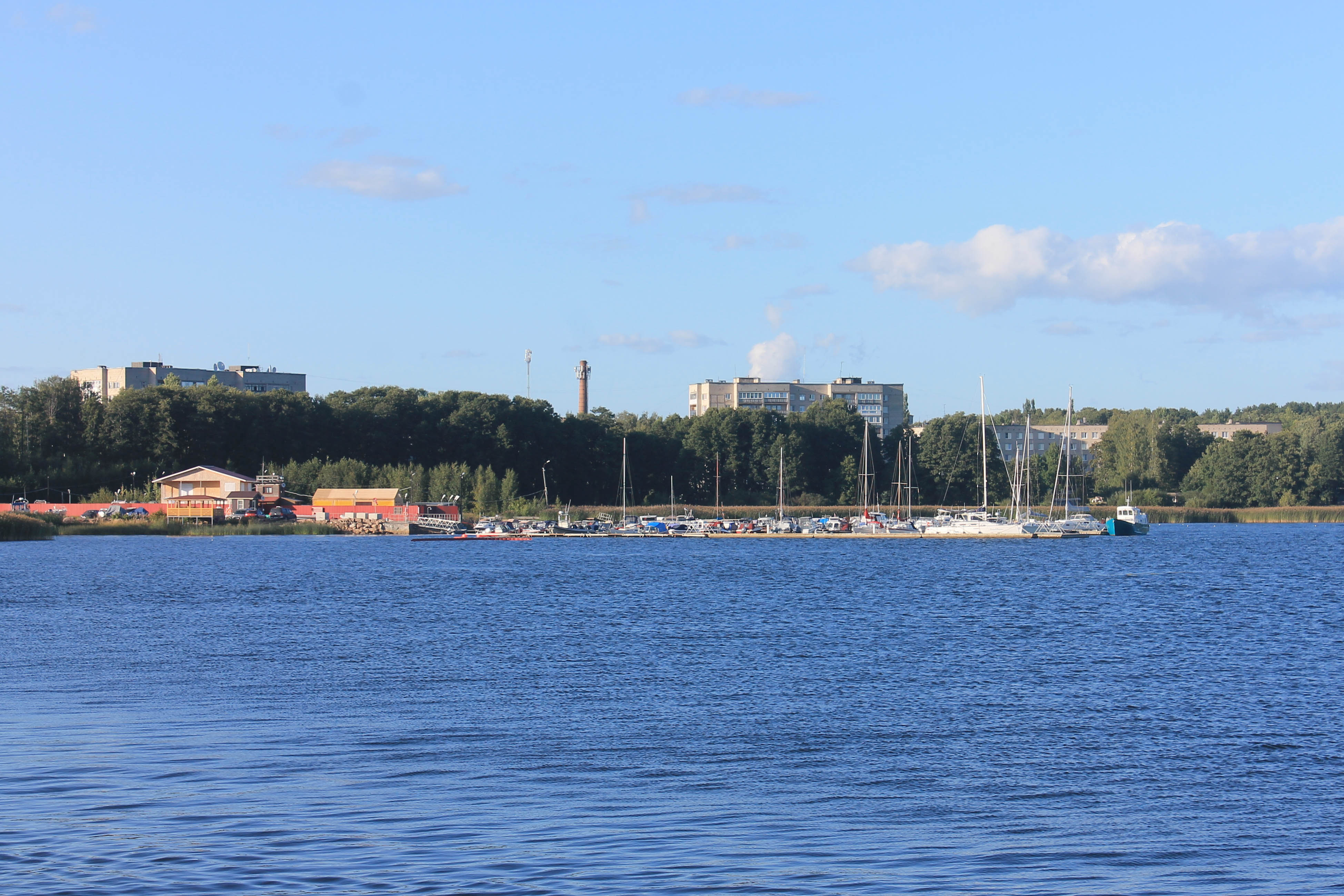
- Primorsk from bay

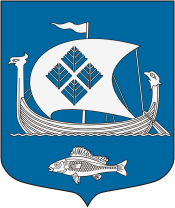
- Coat of arms
- Interactive map of Primorsk
- Location of Primorsk Primorsk (European Russia) Primorsk (Baltic Sea) Primorsk (Europe)
- Coordinates: 60°22′N 28°37′E
- Country: Russia
- Federal subject: Leningrad Oblast
- Administrative district: Vyborgsky District
- Settlement municipal formationSelsoviet: Primorskoye Settlement Municipal Formation
- First mentioned: 1268
- Town status since: 1940
- Elevation: 5 m (16 ft)

Population (2010 Census)
  - Total: 6,119
  - Estimate (2024): 6,334 (+3.5%)

Administrative status
  - Capital of: Primorskoye Settlement Municipal Formation

Municipal status
  - Municipal district: Vyborgsky Municipal District
  - Urban settlement: Primorskoye Urban Settlement
  - Capital of: Primorskoye Urban Settlement
- Time zone: UTC+3 (MSK)
- Postal code: 188910
- Dialing code: +7 81378
- OKTMO ID: 41615108001
- Town Day: Third Saturday of September

Primorsk (Russian: Примо́рск; Finnish: Koivisto; Swedish: Björkö) is a coastal town in Vyborgsky District of Leningrad Oblast, Russia and is the second largest Russian port on the Baltic, after St. Petersburg. It is located on the Karelian Isthmus, 137 kilometers (85 mi) west of St. Petersburg, at the northern coast of the Gulf of Finland, near Beryozovye Islands (Finnish: Koivusaari (Koivistonsaari), Tiurinsaari ja Piisaari; Swedish: Björkö) which are protected as a sea bird sanctuary. Population: 6,119 (2010 census); 5,332 (2002 census); 6,637 (1989 Soviet census).

== History ==
Historical affiliations

Kingdom of Sweden 1293–1721
Russian Empire 1721–1917
Grand Duchy of Finland (Russian Empire) 1811-1917
Republic of Finland 1917–1918
Finnish Socialist Workers' Republic 1918
Republic of Finland 1918–1940
Soviet Union 1940–1941
Republic of Finland 1941–1944
Soviet Union 1944–1991
Russian Federation 1991–present

It was first mentioned in Russian chronicles as Beryozovskoye (Берёзовское, lit. birch settlement) in 1268, when the Hanseatic merchants from Gotland petitioned the Novgorod Republic to secure their passage to the Neva River. The original Finnish name Koivisto means "a group of birch trees", "a birch forest". Swedish name Björkö means "birch island". Swedes annexed the region during the Third Swedish Crusade. Novgorod formally ceded the area to Sweden in the Treaty of Nöteborg in 1323. Thereafter Primorsk was organized under the control of the Fief of Viborg. It became a separate parish from the parish of Viborg in 1575. The Russians retook the islands at the close of the Great Northern War in 1721. This was confirmed by the Treaty of Nystad in 1721.

In 1710, during the Great Northern War, the troops of Tsar Peter the Great included the whole area of the modern Vyborgsky District to Russia. In the course of Peter's second administrative reform, the area became a part of Vyborg Province of St. Petersburg Governorate. The 1721 Treaty of Nystad, which concluded the war with Sweden, finalized the transfer of this part of Old Finland to Russia. In 1744, Vyborg Governorate, with the seat in Vyborg, was established. After several changes, Vyborg Governorate was renamed Finland Governorate in 1802. In 1811, it was renamed back and included in the Grand Duchy of Finland, which was previously ceded to Russia by Sweden. In Finland, it became known as the Viipuri Province. On July 24, 1905, Wilhelm II of the German Empire and Tsar Nicholas II of Russia signed the Treaty of Björkö (Treaty of Koivisto) as a secret mutual defense accord. In 1918, the Viipuri Province became a part of independent Finland.

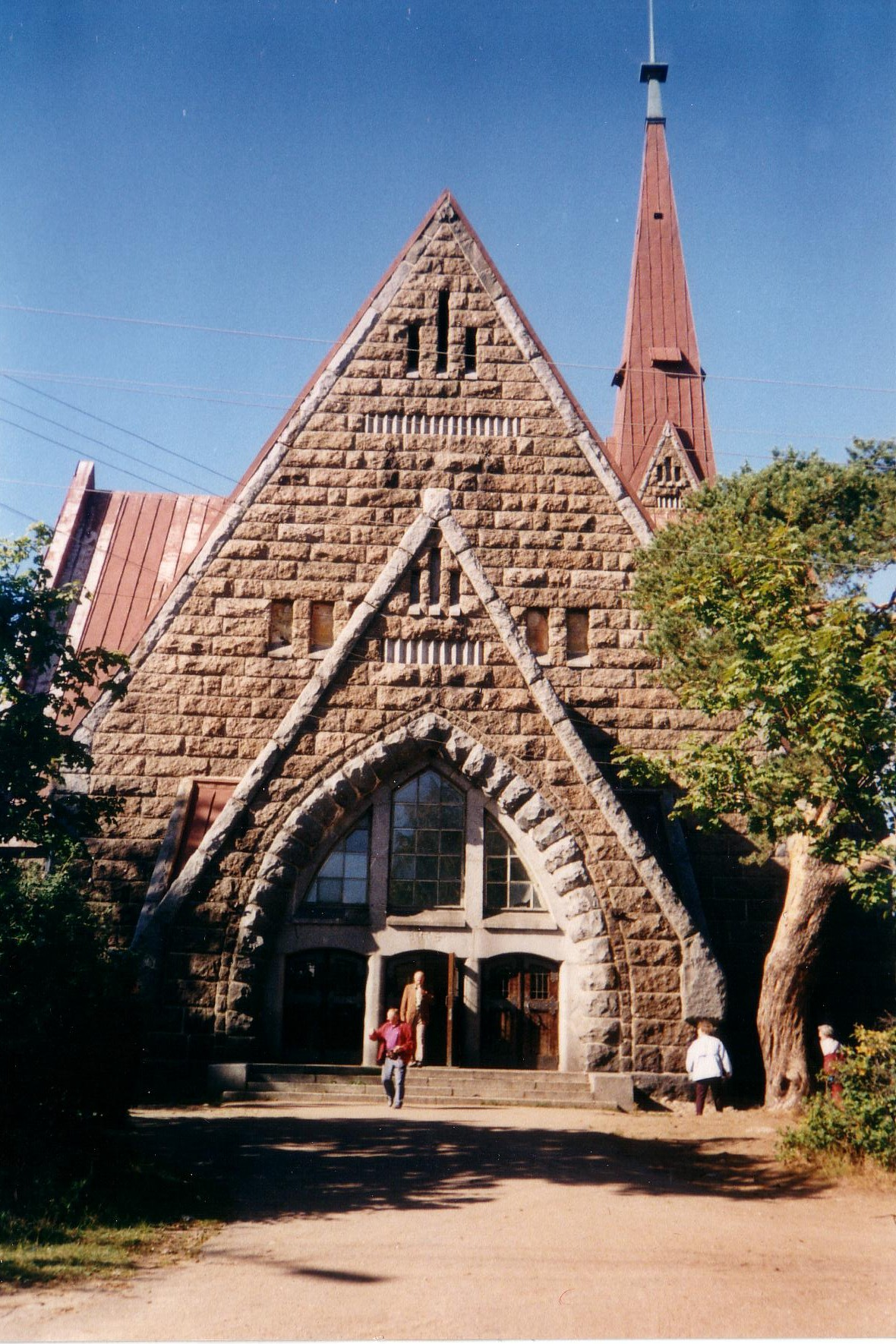
A church in Primorsk, originally a Finnish Lutheran church designed by Josef Stenbäck, 1902–1904

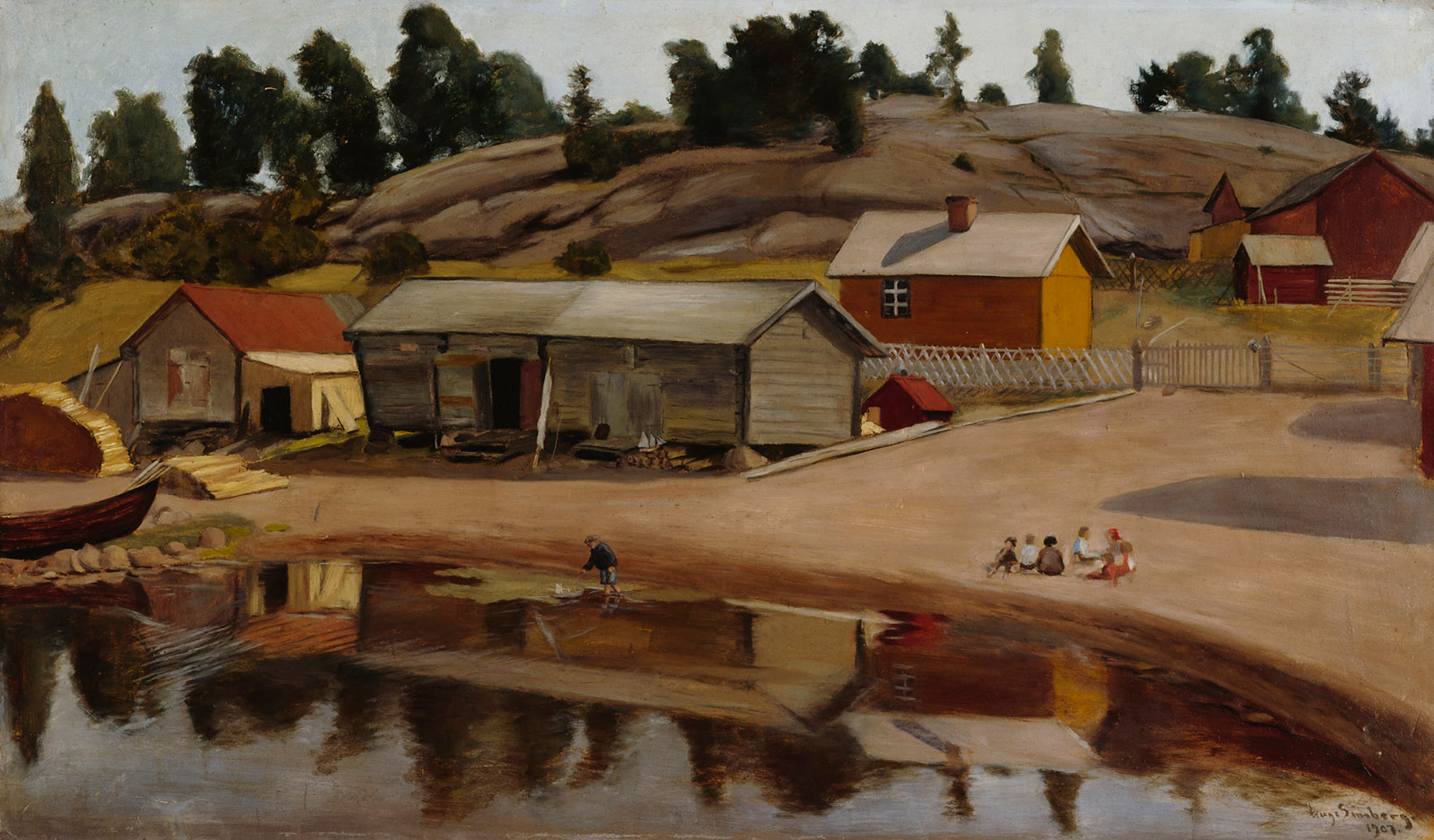
Shore View from Koivisto, Hugo Simberg, 1907

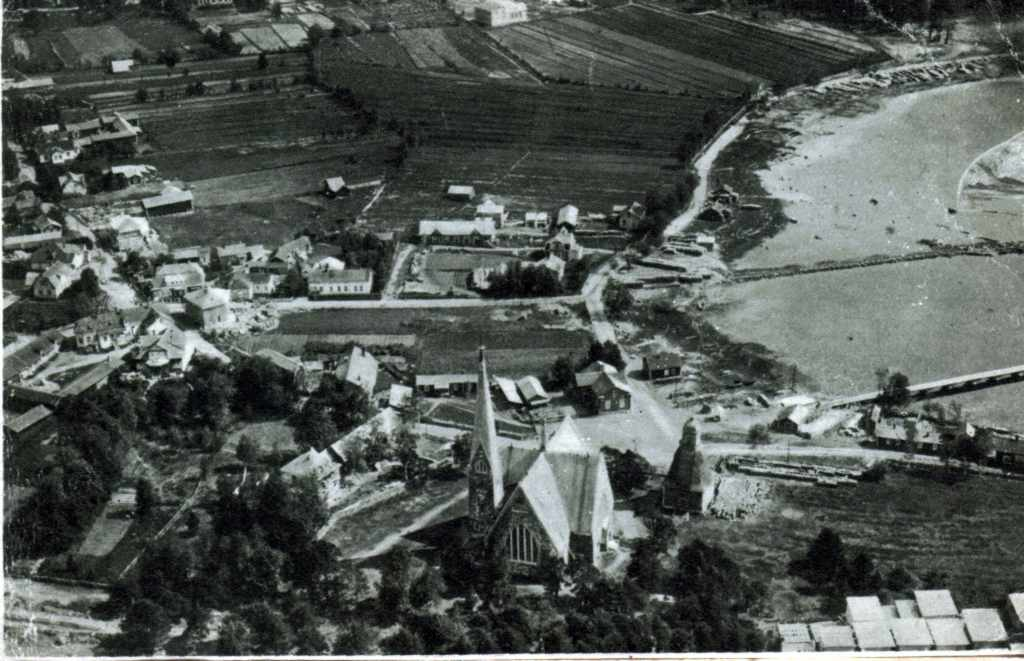
Finnish Koivisto in 1934

Koivisto, together with the rest of the Karelian Isthmus, was ceded by Finland to the Soviet Union by the Moscow Peace Treaty as a result of the Winter War. It was recaptured by Finns in early September 1941 following the Soviet defeat at the Battle of Porlampi. The Finns held Koivisto during Continuation War but again ceded the town to the Soviet Union after the Moscow Armistice. This secession was formalized after signing Paris Peace Treaty in 1947. The population was resettled to Finland and population from Central Russia was moved to populate the Karelian Isthmus.

On May 16, 1940, Koivisto became the administrative center of the newly established Koyvistovsky District in Leningrad Oblast. At the same time, Koivisto was granted town status. On October 1, 1948, the town was renamed Primorsk and the district was renamed Primorsky. On April 3, 1954, Primorsky District was abolished and merged into Roshchinsky District, with the administrative center in Roshchino. On January 4, 1957, Primorsk was transferred to Vyborgsky District.

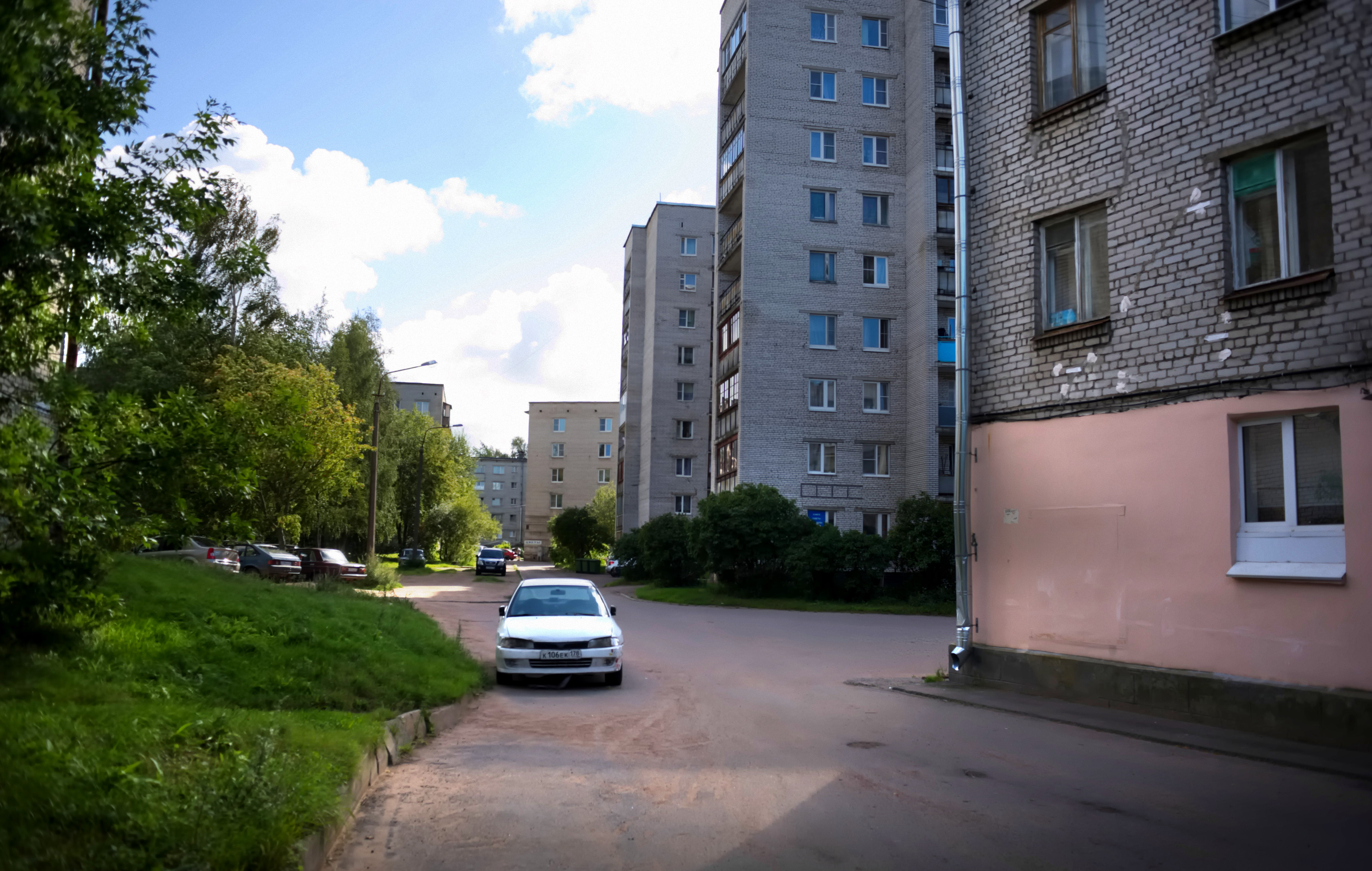
Apartment buildings near the town center in 2016

Primorsk evolved in the 20th century as an outport for the town of Vyborg.

== Administrative and municipal status ==
Within the framework of administrative divisions, it is, together with twenty rural localities, incorporated within Vyborgsky District as Primorskoye Settlement Municipal Formation. As a municipal division, Primorskoye Settlement Municipal Formation is incorporated within Vyborgsky Municipal District as Primorskoye Urban Settlement.

== Economy ==
=== Port of Primorsk ===
The town is the site of reportedly the largest Baltic Sea oil terminal, Port of Primorsk. It was developed as a terminus of the Baltic Pipeline System at a cost of two billion US dollars. The terminal started to operate in December 2001, supplanting Ventspils and other foreign rivals within one year. In 2006, Primorsk was ranked first in Russia in crude oil export, with the export volume of 5,863,000 metric tons.

In the wake of the 2022 Russian invasion of Ukraine, on April 29, 2022, Rosneft was not scheduled to export any diesel from Primorsk in May, as demand from Europe dropped off due to sanctions. On 12 September, 2025, Ukraine bombed the Port of Primorsk to try to limit oil exports from Russia, which are Russia's main source of revenue.

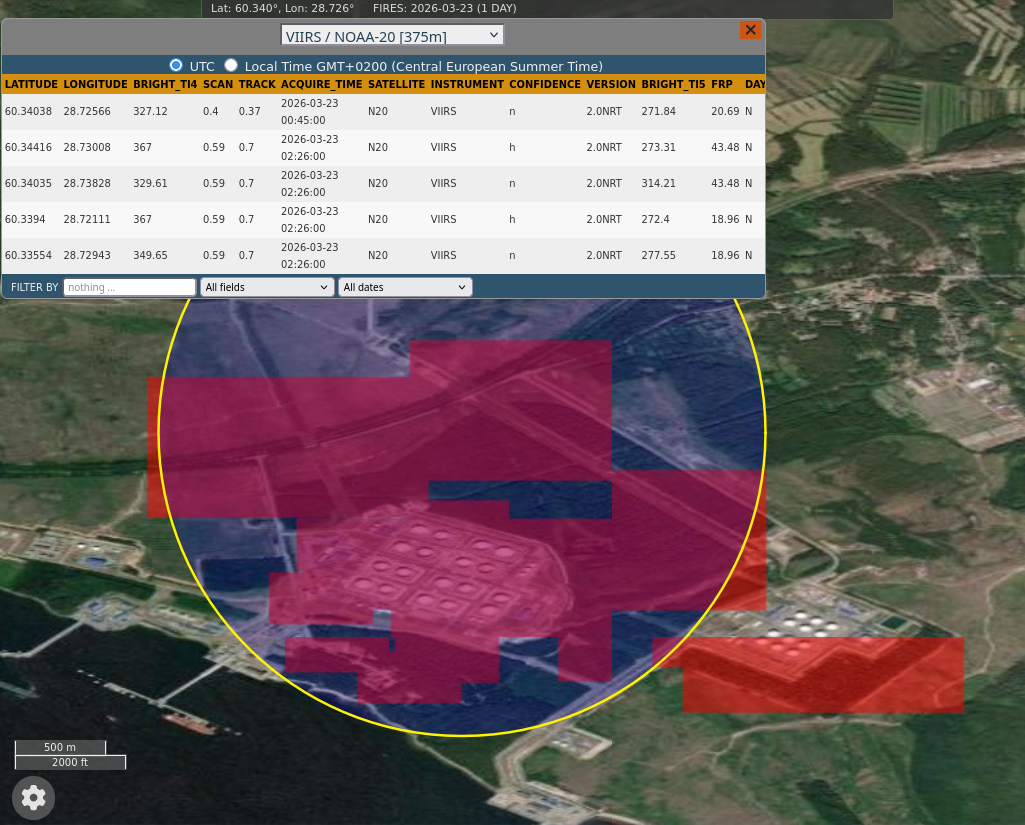
NASA's FIRMS detected extensive fires on 23 March 2026 00:45:00 (UTC) at the port of Primorsk

On 23 March 2026 Ukrainian drones attacked and caused fire at the port of Primorsk.

=== Transportation ===
The town is on the railway line linking St. Petersburg to Vyborg. There is suburban train service to Finland Station in St. Petersburg.

The town is connected by roads with Vyborg and with Zelenogorsk and is also linked by bus to other localities nearby.

== Notable people ==
- Eino Kirjonen, Olympic ski jumper
- Voitto Soini, professional ice hockey player
