= Port of Liepāja =

Port in Liepaja, Latvia

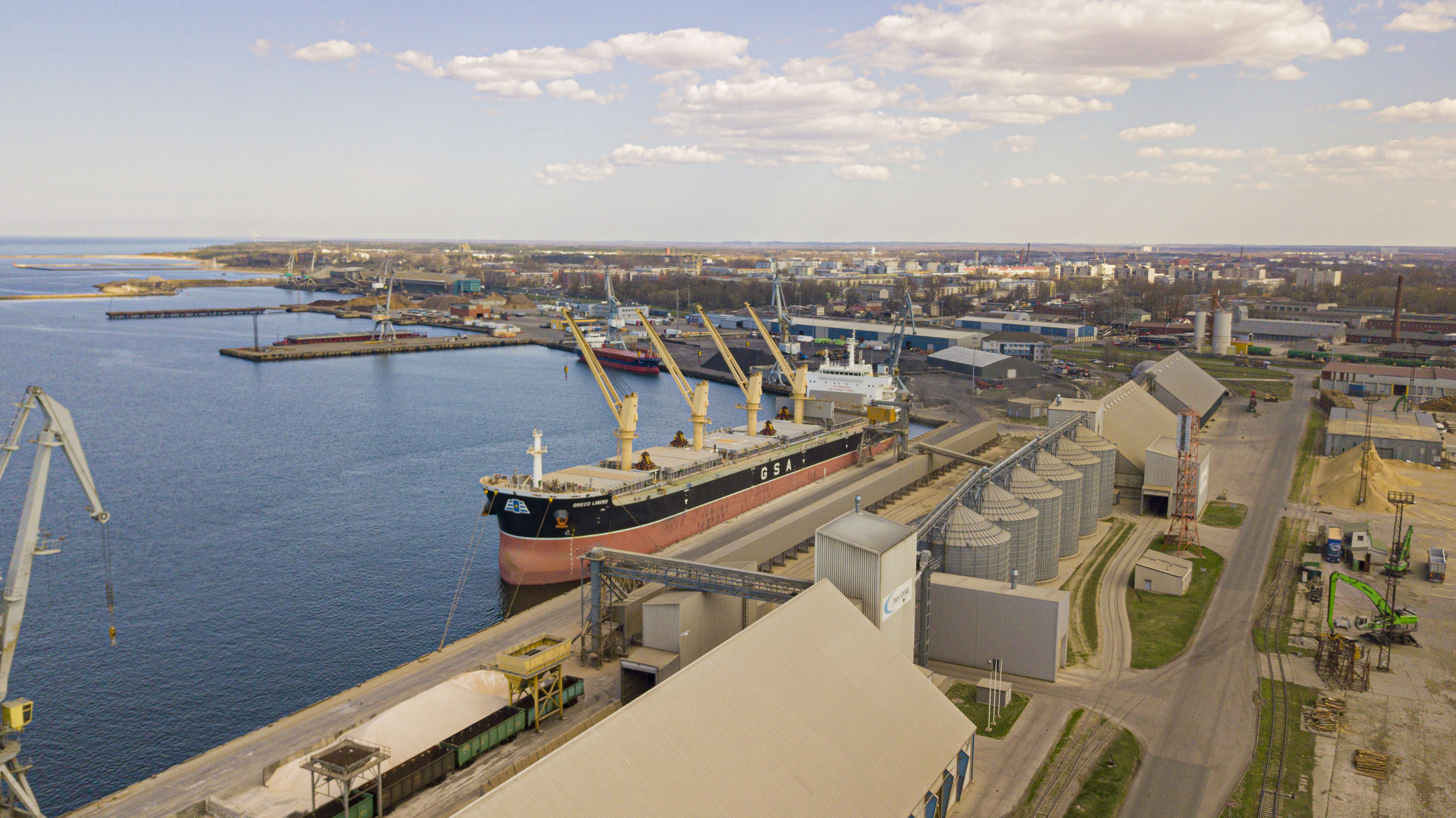
- Interactive map of Port of Liepāja
- Location within Latvia

Location
- Country: Latvia
- Coordinates: 56°32′07″N 20°59′48″E

Statistics
- Website liepaja-sez.lv

Port of Liepaja (Latvian: Liepājas osta) is a port in Liepāja, Latvia. It handled 7 334 261,80 tonnes of cargo and 39 987 passengers in 2019, making it the third largest port in the country (by territory, number of passengers and amount of cargo handled).

== Ships serving the terminal ==
Company	Ship	Route	Notes
(Sweden) Stena Line	MS Stena Flavia	Liepāja – Travemünde	
(Sweden) Stena Line	MS Stena Livia	Liepāja – Travemünde	

== See also ==
- Ports of the Baltic Sea
