= Port of Ventspils =

Port in Ventspils, Latvia

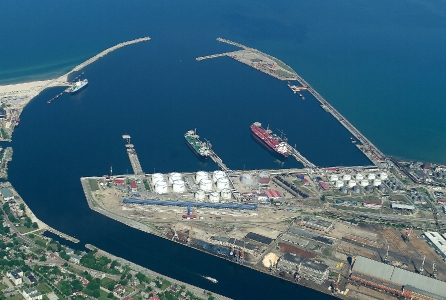
- Port facilities at Ventspils
- Interactive map of Port of Ventspils
- Location in Latvia

Location
- Country: Latvia
- Location: Ventspils, Latvia
- Coordinates: 57°23′46″N 21°33′44″E

Details
- Size of harbour: 242.60 ha (599.5 acres)
- Size: 2,451.39 ha (6,057.5 acres)
- No. of piers: 64
- Draft depth: 17.5 m (57 ft)

Statistics
- Annual cargo tonnage: 8.53 million tonnes (2025)
- Passenger traffic: 270,283 passengers (2025)
- Website www.portofventspils.lv/en/

The Port of Ventspils is an ice-free deep-water sea port in Ventspils, Latvia, on the Baltic Sea coast. The port's total area is 2,451.39 hectares, including 242.60 hectares of port water area, and its maximum depth is 17.5 metres. In 2024, cargo loaded and unloaded at Ventspils port amounted to 8.2 million tonnes.

The port's technical parameters include a maximum capacity of 150,000 DWT and a maximum draft of 15 metres for liquid and bulk cargo and 14.1 metres for general cargo, roll-on/roll-off cargo and containers. The port has 64 piers with a total length of 11,984 metres.

In 2025, terminals at the Freeport of Ventspils handled 8.53 million tonnes of cargo, 3.6% more than in 2024. The largest cargo groups were oil products, roll-on/roll-off cargo and coal; the port also served 270,283 passengers.

== The Freeport of Ventspils ==
The port is administered by the Freeport of Ventspils Authority. Its operations are regulated by Latvian port and freeport legislation, including the Law on Ports, the Ventspils Freeport Law and rules on tax application in free ports and special economic zones.

== Infrastructure ==
The port is connected with road, rail, ferry and airport infrastructure. Ventspils is on European route E22 and the East-West railway corridor, and the port is part of the European TEN-T transport network. Regular ferry traffic connects Ventspils with Sweden, and Ventspils Airport is located in the territory of the freeport.

== See also ==
- Ports of the Baltic Sea
