= Joint Vienna Institute =

Training organization in Vienna

The Joint Vienna Institute (JVI) is an international organization in Vienna, Austria. It was established in 1992 to provide professional training to public officials from economic institutions, including central banks, supporting the post-communist transition in Central and Eastern Europe and the post-Soviet states.

== Overview ==
The JVI was established in September 1992 as a common project of the Austrian Ministry of Finance, Bank of International Settlements (BIS), European Bank for Reconstruction and Development (EBRD), International Monetary Fund (IMF), Organisation for Economic Co-operation and Development (OECD), Oesterreichische Nationalbank (OeNB), and International Bank for Reconstruction and Development (World Bank). The initial idea came from the OeNB, and was strongly supported by IMF Managing Director Michel Camdessus.

The JVI was initially intended as a temporary structure to accompany the post-communist transition, expected to close in August 2004. In 2002, however, the sponsoring organizations decided to make it permanent. In the early 2010s, the Austrian government and the IMF were the JVI's main financial backers. They have extended their financial commitment to the JVI on a four-year basis, with renewals in 2010, 2014, 2018, and 2022.

The JVI's membership was expanded beyond the founders to include the World Trade Organization (WTO) in 1998 and the European Investment Bank (EIB) in 2013. The European Commission, which supported the JVI from the start but declined to be one of its founding members for legal reasons, gained observer status in 2007.

== Leadesrhip ==
- Andrew Beith, Director 1992-1995
- Horst Struckmeyer, Director ca. 1995-1998
- Lindsay Wolfe, Director ca. 1998-2002
- Pamela Bradley, Director ca. 2002-2006
- Eduard Hochreiter, Director 2006-2012
- Norbert Funke, Director 2012-2016
- Thomas Richardson, Director 2016-2020
- Hervé Joly, Director since 2020

== Influence ==
The JVI's perceived success has inspired the IMF to co-sponsor similar ventures in other regions:

- the Singapore Regional Training Institute (STI) established in 1998-1999 with the Singaporean government;
- the Joint Africa Institute in Abidjan (1999-2009) and Joint Partnership for Africa in Tunis (2010-2017), both with the African Development Bank;
- the IMF–Arab Monetary Fund Regional Training Program also established in 1999 and superseded in 2011 by the IMF–Middle East Center for Economics and Finance (MECEF) in Kuwait City;
- the Joint China-IMF Training Program (CTP) established in 2000 with the People’s Bank of China and succeeded in 2018 by the China-IMF Capacity Development Center (CICDC);
- the Joint Regional Training Center for Latin America (BTC), active in Brazil from 2001 to 2020;
- the Joint India-IMF Training Program (ITP), established in 2006 with the Reserve Bank of India with support from Australia and succeeded in 2017 by the South Asia Regional Training and Technical Assistance Center (SARTTAC);
- the Africa Training Institute (ATI) established in 2013 in Mauritius.

Since 2016, these are collectively referred to by the IMF as Regional Capacity Development Centers (RCDCs).

== See also ==
- Financial Stability Institute
