= Great Port of Saint Petersburg =

Industrial port in Saint Petersburg, Russia

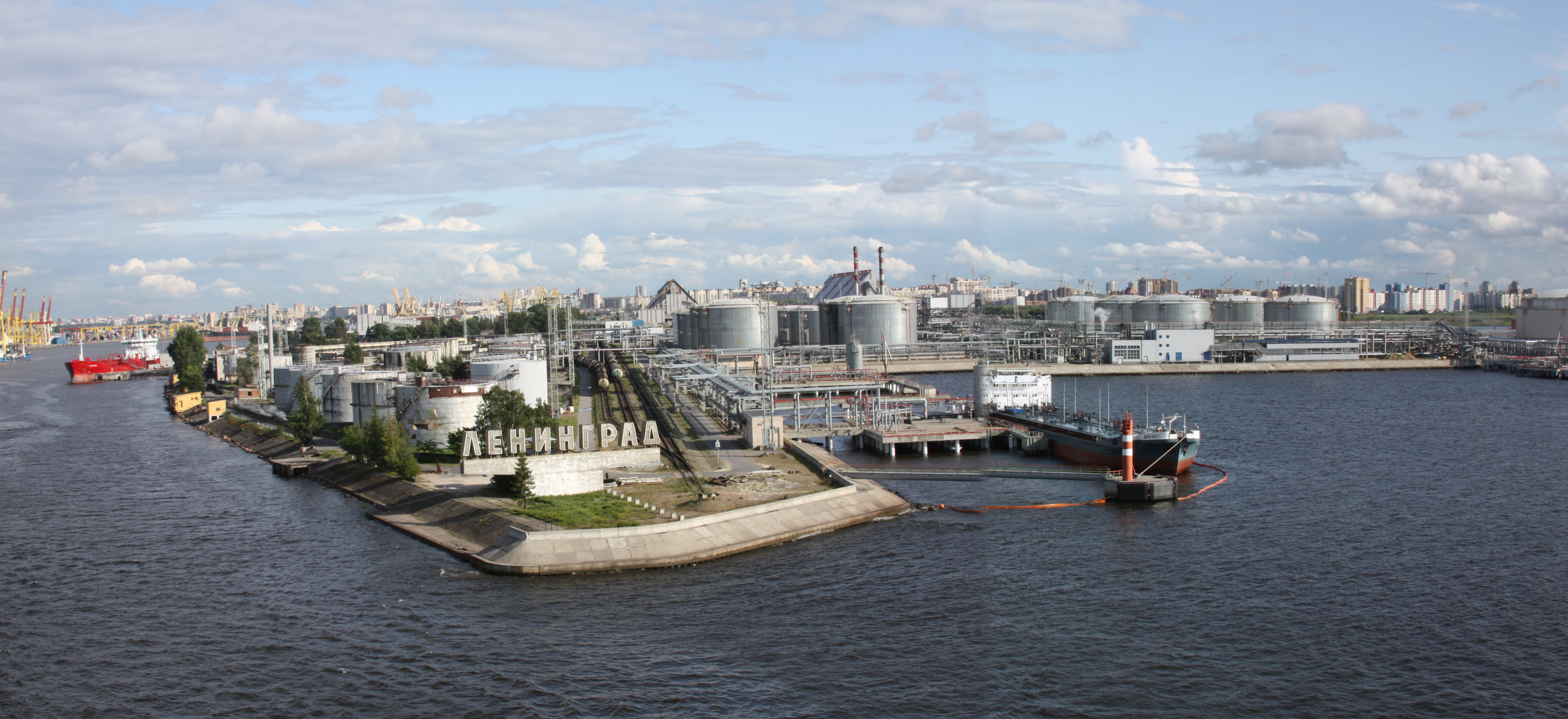
- View of the port
- Interactive map of Great Port of Saint Petersburg
- Location within Russia
- Native name: Большой порт Санкт-Петербург (Russian)

Location
- Country: Russia
- Location: Saint Petersburg
- Coordinates: 59°52′50″N 30°11′57″E

Details
- Type of Harbor: Sea
- Size: Large

Statistics
- Website; The Port of Saint Petersburg

The Great Port of St. Petersburg (Russian: Большой порт Санкт-Петербург) or Port of St. Petersburg is a major seaport serving the city of St. Petersburg in northwest Russia. The port's water area is 616.93 km^{2}. The berthing front is 21.7 km long with 147 berths. The maximum draft for ships is 13 metres (43 ft). Since 2011, the port has been under the authority of a state-owned enterprise (federal government agency), the Port Authority of the Great Port of St. Petersburg. This agency oversees commercial navigation in the seaport of St. Petersburg and beyond in the designated areas of responsibility of the Russian Federation.

== History ==
In 1869, Nikolay Putilov (1820–1880)—a Russian naval officer, mathematician, engineer, metallurgist, entrepreneur, co-founder of the Obukhov factory, and founder of the Putilov factory—began preparations for the Sea Port of St. Petersburg with a sea canal from Kronstadt to St. Petersburg. On June 13, 1874, Tsar Alexander II approved a provision "On the Temporary Administration of the St. Petersburg Sea." The general direction of the channel was approved by Alexander on August 21 of the same year. On October 26, a contract for the production of works and supplies on the St. Petersburg Canal was signed. N. I. Putilov "with his comrades" received a contract order for the works. After Putilov's sudden death, the project was completed by his companions P. A. Boreysha and S. P. Maksimovich, assisted by the Finland Swedish engineer F. E. Edelheim. On May 15, 1885, the 32 km (20-mile) channel was opened to the passage of ships, and a new Maritime Trade Port was opened.

Putilov was buried, at his request, on the bank of the Ekateringofka River on Gladky Island, commanding a view over his factory, his port, and the Morskoy Canal. A chapel by architect F. S. Kharlamov was erected on his grave. His remains were re-buried in the crypt of St. Nicholas Church in 1907, which was built by architect V. A. Kosyakov in 1901–06 on what is today Stachek Avenue. His grave was destroyed in 1951.

== General information ==
The central unit of the Great Port of St. Petersburg is located on and around the islands of the Neva River Delta, in the Nevsky Lip of the eastern part of the Gulf of Finland, an arm of the Baltic Sea. The port includes the berths for maritime trade; forest, fish and river ports; an oil terminal; shipbuilding, ship repair and other industries; a sea passenger terminal; a river passenger terminal; piers at Kronstadt and Lomonosov; and the Gorskaya and Bronka facilities. They are connected by an extensive system of channels and fairways. The sea trade port includes about 200 berths with depths of up to 11.9 metres (39 ft). It is divided into four districts. The container terminal includes berths 82–87, and both container ships and roll-on/roll-off vessels are accepted for processing.

The first and second areas of the seaport are served by the New Port railway station, the third and fourth by the Avtovo railway station.

The port fleet includes service and support vessels belonging to various organizations, including more than twenty tugs of various capacities, icebreakers, oil harvesters, water cannon, boat collectors, boaters, pilot boats, raid boats, fireboats, and barges.

=== Composition ===
The Great Port of St. Petersburg includes:

- Pools:
  - East
  - Baroque
  - Passenger
  - Forest Maul Raid
  - Coal Harbour
- Vasileostrovsk cargo port
- Berths in Kronstadt
- Berths in Lomonosov
- Bronka deepwater port

== Operations ==
Oil products, metals, forest products, containers, coal, ore, chemical cargoes, and scrap metal are loaded in the port of St. Petersburg. The cargo turnover in January–February 2016 amounted to 7.5 million tons, down 7.0% compared to the same period in 2015.

The main stevedoring companies operating in the port are the Seaport of St. Petersburg, NEVA-METALL, Baltic Bulker Terminal, Moby Dick LLC, St. Petersburg Petroleum Terminal, First Container Terminal, and Petrolesport.

Year	Million tons
1913	7.3
1940	3.18
1945	0.79
1950	1.37
1960	6.3
1970	7.6
1980	12.2
1997	20.5
2000	32
2005	57.5
2010	58
2011	60
2012	57.8
2013	58
2014	61.2
2015	51.5
2016	48.6
2017	53.6
2018	59.3
2019	59.9

== See also ==
- Ports of the Baltic Sea
