= List of busiest ports in Europe =

The table below lists 20 of the busiest ports in Europe; Rotterdam currently ranks first here, and eleventh in the world by cargo tonnage. For ferries, transport vehicles like heavy trucks are included using their full weight, while passenger cars are not counted as cargo.

Top 20 ports of Europe by annual cargo tonnage
#	Port	Country	City/Cities	Body of water	Tons	Year
1	Port of Rotterdam	(European Union) Netherlands	Rotterdam	North Sea	428,372,000	2025
2	Port of Antwerp-Bruges	(European Union) Belgium	Antwerp, Bruges	North Sea	266,500,000	2025
3	Port of Novorossiysk	Russia	Novorossiysk	Black Sea	168,000,000	2025
4	Port of Ust-Luga	Russia	Ust-Luga	Baltic Sea	130,500,000	2025
5	Port of Hamburg	(European Union) Germany	Hamburg	North Sea	114,600,000	2025
6	Port of Algeciras	(European Union) Spain	Algeciras	Mediterranean Sea	100,673,394	2025
7	Port of Le Havre-Rouen-Paris	(European Union) France	Le Havre, Rouen, Paris	English Channel	84,700,000	2025
8	Port of Valencia	(European Union) Spain	Valencia	Mediterranean Sea	80,669,505	2025
9	Port of Gdańsk	(European Union) Poland	Gdańsk	Baltic Sea	80,400,000	2025
10	Port of Marseille	(European Union) France	Marseille	Mediterranean Sea	74,000,000	2025
11	Port of Barcelona	(European Union) Spain	Barcelona	Mediterranean Sea	69,452,054	2025
12	Port of Bergen	Norway	Bergen	North Sea	69,165,637	2025
13	Port of Constanța	(European Union) Romania	Constanța	Black Sea	67,578,279	2025
14	North Sea Port	(European Union) Belgium (European Union) Netherlands	Vlissingen, Borsele, Terneuzen, Ghent	North Sea	67,000,000	2025
15	Ports of Bremen	(European Union) Germany	Bremerhaven, Bremen	North Sea	65,300,000	2025
16	Port of Primorsk	Russia	Primorsk	Baltic Sea	63,900,000	2025
17	Port of Genoa	(European Union) Italy	Genoa, Pra', Savona, Vado Ligure	Mediterranean Sea	62,922,512	2025
18	Port of Amsterdam	(European Union) Netherlands	Amsterdam	North Sea	62,100,000	2025
19	Seaports of Niedersachsen	(European Union) Germany	Brake, Cuxhaven, Emden, Leer, Nordenham, Oldenburg, Papenburg, Stade, Wilhelmshaven	North Sea	60,500,000	2025
20	Port of Trieste	(European Union) Italy	Trieste	Adriatic Sea	59,991,400	2025

== Busiest container ports ==
The table below lists 20 of the busiest container ports in Europe with the containers counted in TEU.

Top 20 ports of Europe by annual containers TEU
Port	Country	City/Cities	Body of water	Containers TEU	Year
Port of Rotterdam	(European Union) Netherlands	Rotterdam	North Sea	14,244,954	2025
Port of Antwerp-Bruges	(European Union) Belgium	Antwerp, Bruges	North Sea	13,630,000	2025
Port of Hamburg	(European Union) Germany	Hamburg	North Sea	8,300,000	2025
Port of Valencia	(European Union) Spain	Valencia	Mediterranean Sea	5,662,661	2025
Ports of Bremen	(European Union) Germany	Bremerhaven, Bremen	North Sea	4,900,000	2025
Port of Algeciras	(European Union) Spain	Algeciras	Mediterranean Sea	4,738,146	2025
Port of Piraeus	(European Union) Greece	Piraeus	Mediterranean Sea	4,641,295	2025
Port of Gioia Tauro	(European Union) Italy	Gioia Tauro	Mediterranean Sea	4,490,566	2025
Port of Barcelona	(European Union) Spain	Barcelona	Mediterranean Sea	3,726,624	2025
Port of Felixstowe	United Kingdom	Felixstowe	North Sea	3,510,413	2025
Port of Ambarlı	Turkey	Beylikdüzü, Istanbul	Marmara Sea	3,420,000	2025
Port of Le Havre-Rouen-Paris	(European Union) France	Le Havre, Rouen, Paris	English Channel	3,200,000	2025
Port of Genoa	(European Union) Italy	Genoa, Pra', Savona, Vado Ligure	Mediterranean Sea	2,999,486	2025
Port of Marsaxlokk	(European Union) Malta	Birżebbuġa	Mediterranean Sea	2,870,000	2025
Port of London	United Kingdom	London	North Sea	2,802,616	2025
Port of Gdańsk	(European Union) Poland	Gdańsk	Baltic Sea	2,769,000	2025
Port of Tekirdag	Turkey	Tekirdağ	Marmara Sea	2,130,000	2025
Port of Southampton	United Kingdom	Southampton	English Channel	1,946,939	2025
Port of Sines	(European Union) Portugal	Sines	Atlantic Ocean	1,720,000	2025
Seaports of Niedersachsen	(European Union) Germany	Brake, Cuxhaven, Emden, Leer, Nordenham, Oldenburg, Papenburg, Stade, Wilhelmshaven	North Sea	1,470,000	2025

== Busiest passenger ports ==
The table below lists 20 of the busiest passenger ports in Europe.

Top 20 ports of Europe by annual number of passengers
Port	Country	City/Cities	Body of water	Passengers	Year
Port of Piraeus	(European Union) Greece	Piraeus	Mediterranean Sea	19,146,271	2025
Port of Messina	(European Union) Italy	Messina	Mediterranean Sea	11,317,000	2023
Port of Reggio	(European Union) Italy	Reggio Calabria	Mediterranean Sea	11,121,000	2023
Port of Tallinn	(European Union) Estonia	Tallinn	Baltic Sea	10,663,000	2025
Port of Helsinki	(European Union) Finland	Helsinki	Baltic Sea	9,500,000	2024
Port of Dover	United Kingdom	Dover	English Channel	9,323,000	2024
Port of Naples	(European Union) Italy	Naples	Mediterranean Sea	8,496,000	2023
Port of Palma de Mallorca	(European Union) Spain	Palma de Mallorca	Mediterranean Sea	8,208,000	2023
Port of Stockholm	(European Union) Sweden	Stockholm	Baltic Sea	7,242,032	2024
Port of Calais	(European Union) France	Calais	English Channel	7,197,306	2025
Port of Paloukia-Salamina	(European Union) Greece	Paloukia, Salamina	Mediterranean Sea	6,719,000	2023
Port of Perama	(European Union) Greece	Perama	Mediterranean Sea	6,719,000	2023
Port of Mġarr	(European Union) Malta	Mġarr	Mediterranean Sea	6,577,000	2023
Port of Helsingborg	(European Union) Sweden	Helsingborg	Øresund	6,443,911	2024
Port of Helsingør	(European Union) Denmark	Helsingør	Øresund	6,352,000	2023
Port of Santa Cruz de Tenerife	(European Union) Spain	Santa Cruz de Tenerife	Atlantic Ocean	5,906,000	2023
Port of Ċirkewwa	(European Union) Malta	—N/a	Mediterranean Sea	5,883,000	2023
Port of Barcelona	(European Union) Spain	Barcelona	Mediterranean Sea	5,787,516	2025
Port of Capri	(European Union) Italy	Capri	Mediterranean Sea	5,248,000	2023
Port of Genoa	(European Union) Italy	Genoa, Pra', Savona, Vado Ligure	Mediterranean Sea	5,035,214	2025

== Other large ports in Europe ==
=== Albania ===
- Port of Durrës
- Port of Vlorë
- Port of Sarandë

=== Austria ===
- Vienna
- Linz

=== Belgium ===
- Port of Liège - an inland port

=== Bulgaria ===
- Port of Burgas
- Port of Varna

=== Croatia ===
- Port of Split, the largest passenger port in Croatia
- Port of Rijeka, the largest port in Croatia
- Port of Ploče, serves mainly Bosnia and Herzegovina
- Port of Zadar
- Port of Vukovar, the largest river port in Croatia, on Danube river
- Port of Osijek, second largest river port in Croatia, on Drava river

=== Cyprus ===
- Port of Limassol
- Port of Larnaca

=== Denmark ===
- Port of Aarhus
- Port of Esbjerg
- Port of Copenhagen

=== Estonia ===
- Port of Pärnu
- Port of Sillamäe

=== Finland ===
- Port of Helsinki

=== France ===
- Brest
- Caen
- Bordeaux
- Cherbourg
- Dieppe
- Dunkirk
- La Rochelle
- Lorient
- Lyon
- Nantes Saint-Nazaire
- Paris
- Rouen
- Strasbourg
- Toulon

=== Germany ===
- Port of Duisburg–Ruhrort, largest inland port in Europe.
- Port of Kiel
- Port of Rostock
- Cologne
- Dortmund
- Emden
- Essen
- Frankfurt am Main
- Heidelberg
- Lübeck
- Mannheim
- Regensburg
- Wiesbaden
- Wilhelmshaven

=== Greece ===
- Port of Thessaloniki
- Port of Heraklion
- Port of Igoumenitsa
- Port of Rafina
- Port of Patras
- Port of Lavrio
- Port of Souda
- Port of Volos
- Port of Eleusina
- Port of Agioi Theodoroi
- Port of Alexandroupoli
- Port of Aspropyrgos
- Port of Rhodes
- Port of Corfu
- Port of Katakolon

=== Hungary ===
- Budapest

=== Iceland ===
- Reykjavík

=== Ireland ===
- Port of Cork
- Dublin Port
- Rosslare Europort
- Shannon Foynes Port
- Port of Waterford

=== Italy ===
- Port of Augusta
- Port of Bari
- Port of Brindisi
- Port of Civitavecchia (Port of Rome)
- Port of Cagliari
- Port of Livorno
- Port of Naples
- Port of Palermo
- Port of Ravenna
- Port of Salerno
- Port of Savona
- Port of Venice

=== Latvia ===
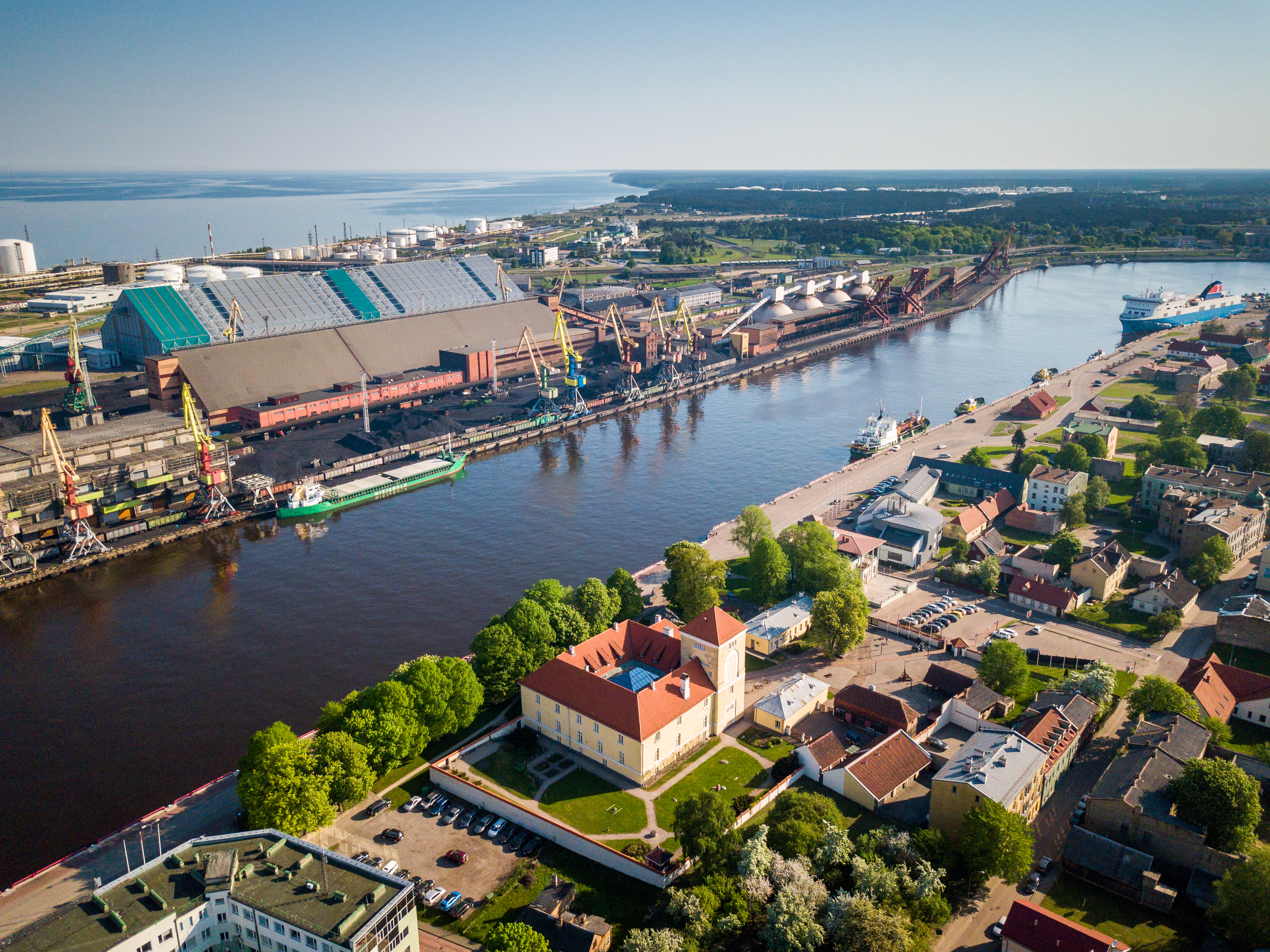
Ventspils port wharf

- Freeport of Riga
- Port of Liepāja
- Port of Ventspils

=== Lithuania ===
- Port of Klaipėda

=== Malta ===
- Grand Harbour
- Malta Freeport

=== Montenegro ===
- Port of Bar, which also serves Serbia

=== Netherlands ===
- Groningen Seaports Eemshaven/ Delfzijl
- Port of Harlingen
- Port of Nijmegen

=== Norway ===
- Haugesund
- Kristiansand
- Narvik
- Oslo
- Porsgrunn
- Stavanger
- Tromsø
- Trondheim

=== Poland ===
- Port of Szczecin-Świnoujście (Port of Szczecin, Port of Świnoujście)
- Port of Gdynia
- Port of Police
- Port of Kołobrzeg
- Port of Elbląg
- Port of Darłowo

=== Portugal ===
- Port of Leixões (Porto)
- Port of Lisbon

=== Romania ===
- Port of Brăila
- Port of Galați
- Port of Mangalia
- Port of Midia
- Port of Sulina
- Port of Tulcea

=== Russia ===
- Arkhangelsk
- Port of Kaliningrad
- Volgograd

=== Serbia ===
- Port of Belgrade

=== Slovenia ===
- Port of Koper

=== Spain ===
- Port of A Coruña
- Port of Alicante
- Port of Almería
- Port of Avilés
- Port of Bilbao, with 179,572 passengers, cargo of 39,397,938, and 557,355 TEUs in 2008
- Port of Cartagena
- Port of Cádiz
- Port of Castellón
- Port of Ceuta
- Port of Ferrol
- Port of Gijón
- Port of Huelva
- Port of Málaga, with 642,529 passengers, cargo of 4,620,000 of tons and 428,623 TEUs in 2008
- Port of Melilla
- Port of Motril
- Rota, a large Spanish naval base
- Port of Las Palmas (Puerto de la Luz)
- Port of Pasajes (Pasaia, Gipuzkoa)
- Port of Santander
- Port of Santa Cruz de Tenerife, Canary Islands
- Port of Seville
- Port of Tarragona
- Port of Vigo, the biggest fishing port in the world with 751,971 tons of fish and shellfish in 2008

=== Sweden ===
Drone footage of Gothenburg harbour

- Port of Åhus
- Copenhagen Malmö Port (with Denmark)
- Port of Gävle
- Port of Gothenburg
- Port of Halmstad
- Port of Hargshamn
- Port of Härnösand
- Port_of_Helsingborg
- Port of Holmsund
- Port of Kalmar
- Port of Karlshamn
- Port of Köping
- Port of Mönsterås
- Port of Norrköping
- Port of Örnsköldsvik
- Port of Oskarshamn
- Port of Oxelösund
- Port of Piteå
- Simpevarp
- Port of Skellefteå
- Port of Sundsvall
- Port of Stockholm
- Port of Storugns
- Port of Trelleborg
- Port of Västerås
- Port of Västervik
- Port of Visby
- Port of Ystad

=== Switzerland ===
- Basel on the Rhine River, the only operational inland port in Switzerland

=== Turkey ===
- Port of İstanbul

=== Ukraine ===
- Port of Chornomorsk
- Port of Mariupol (occupied by Russia)
- Port of Mykolaiv
- Port of Odesa
- Pivdennyi Port
- Sevastopol (occupied by Russia)
- Yalta (occupied by Russia)

=== United Kingdom ===
- Aberdeen, Scotland
- Belfast, Northern Ireland
- Bristol, western England
- Cardiff, South East Wales
- Edinburgh, south-eastern Scotland
- Foyle Port, Northern Ireland
- Glasgow, south-western Scotland
- Kingston upon Hull, north-eastern England
- Liverpool, north-western England
- Manchester via the Manchester Ship Canal to the Irish Sea
- Newcastle upon Tyne, northeastern England
- Portland Harbour, southern England
- Portsmouth Harbour, southern England is one of the oldest ports in England

== Gallery ==
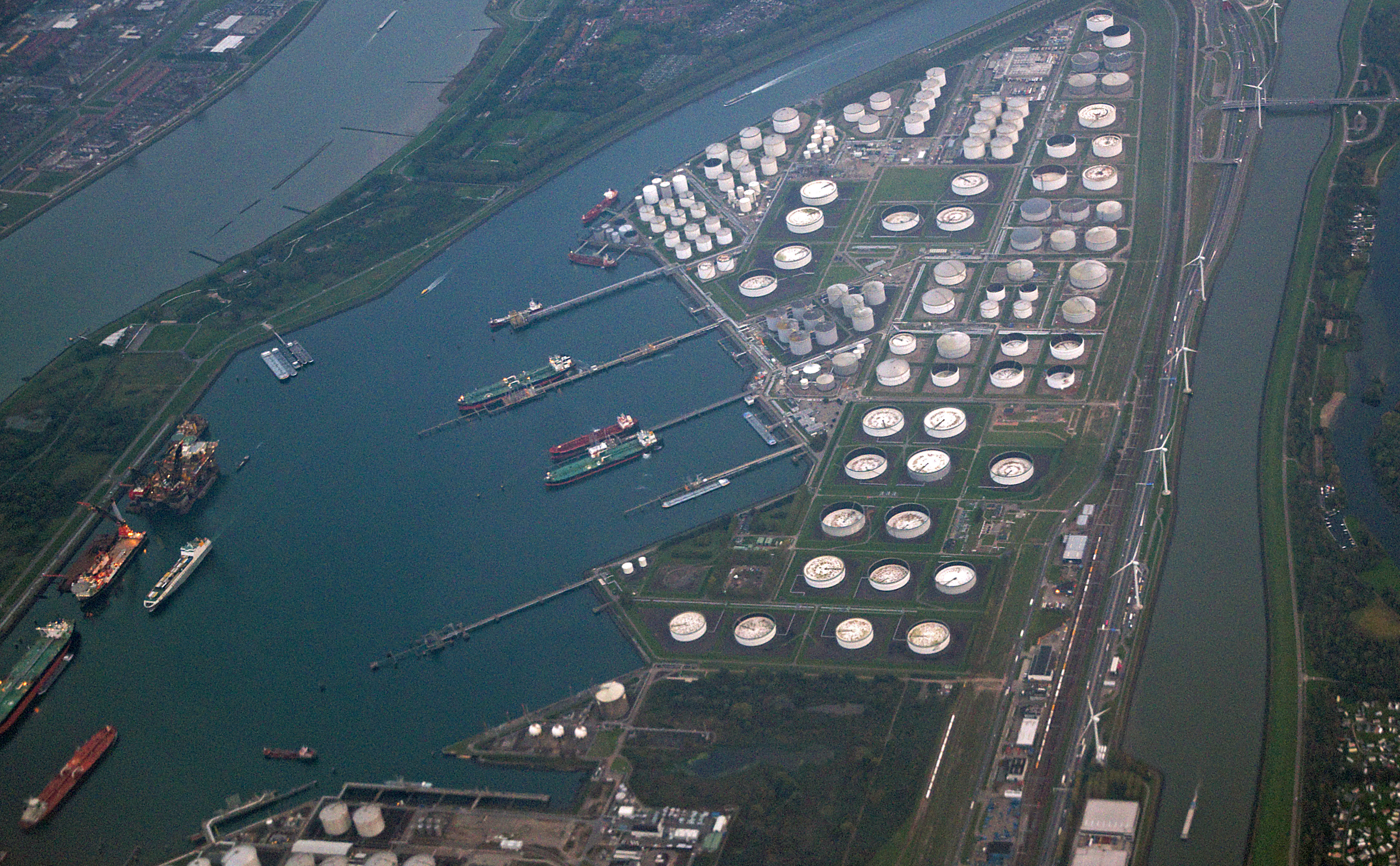
Port of Rotterdam

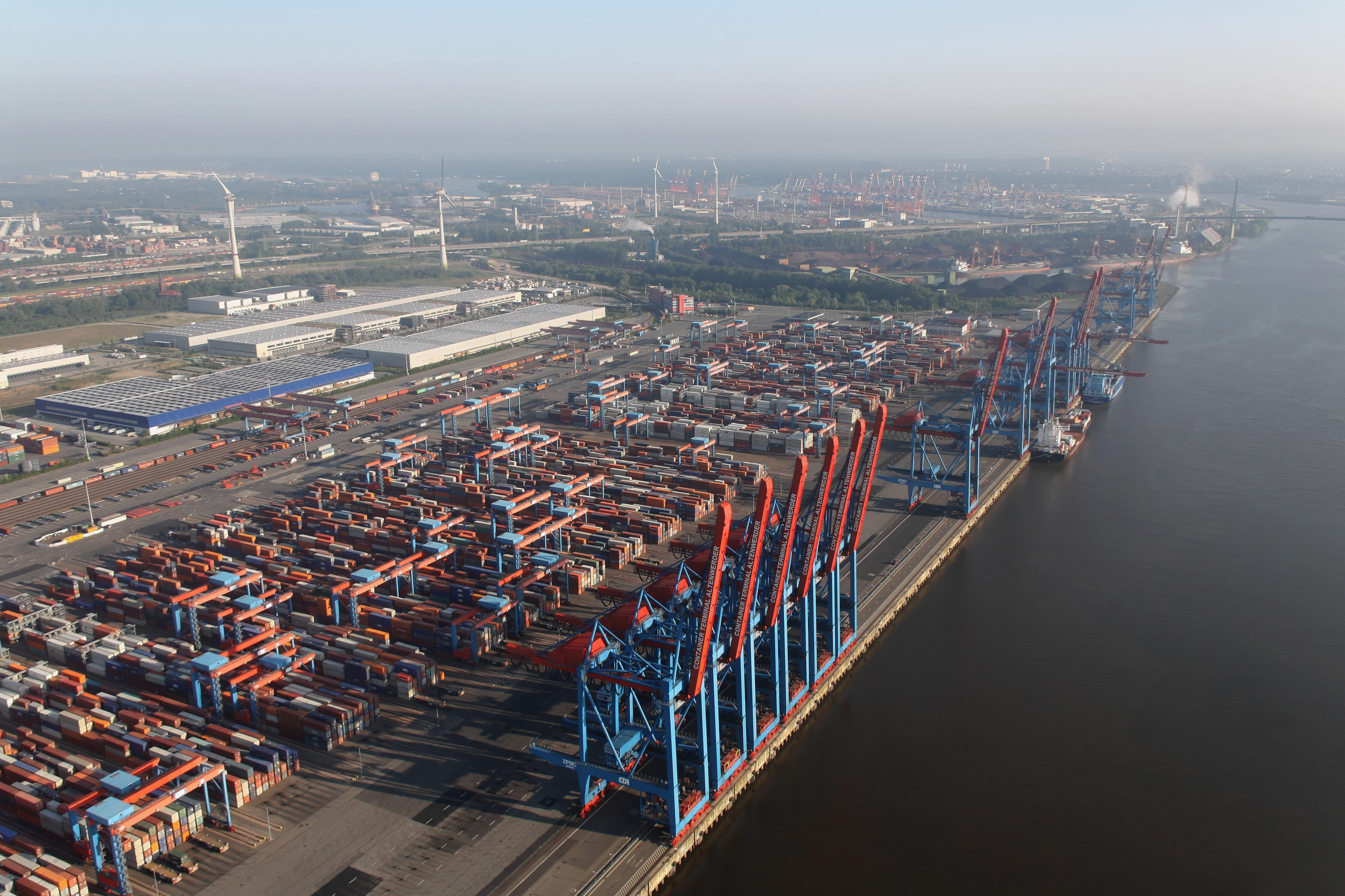
Port of Hamburg

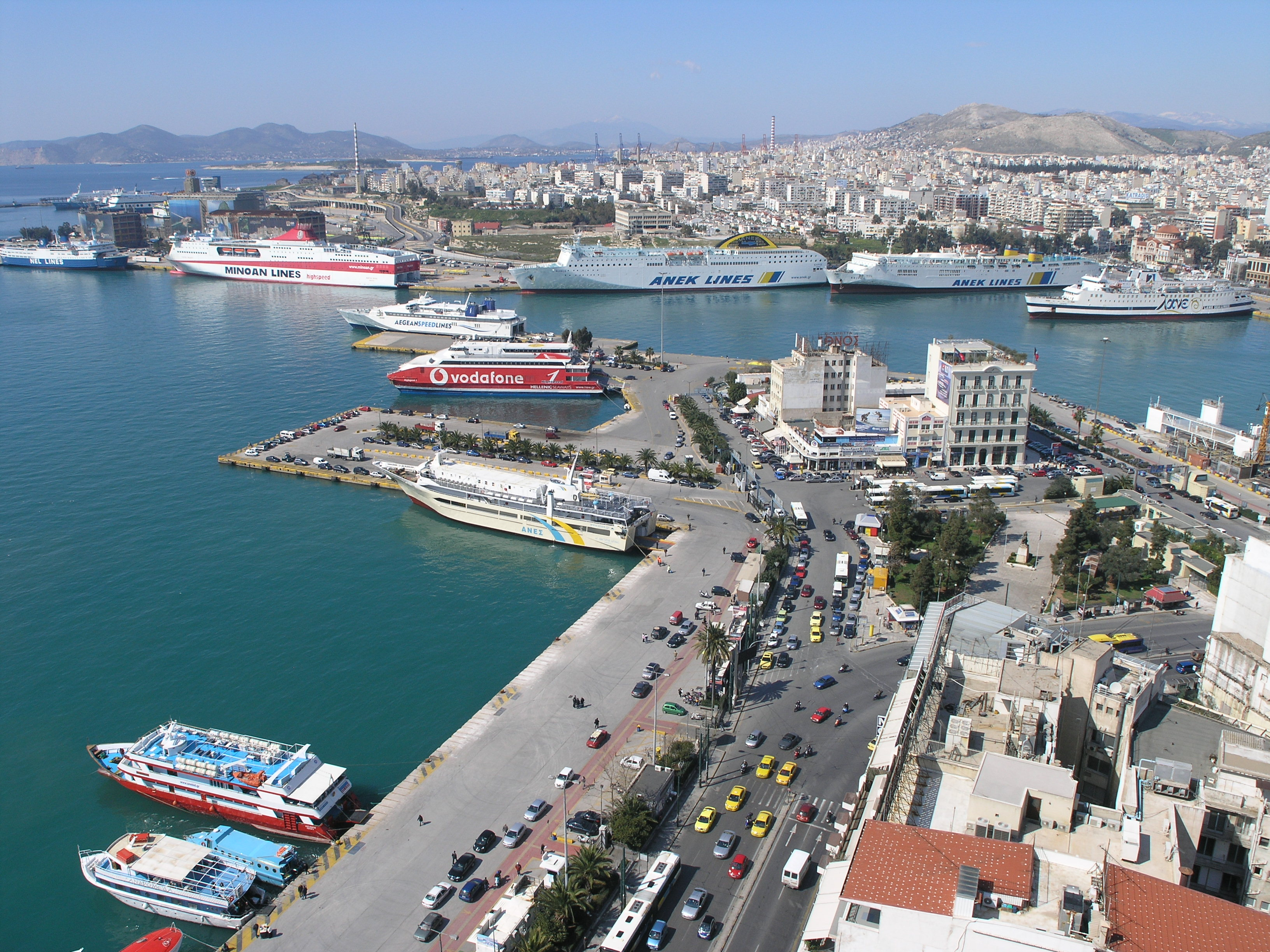
Port of Piraeus

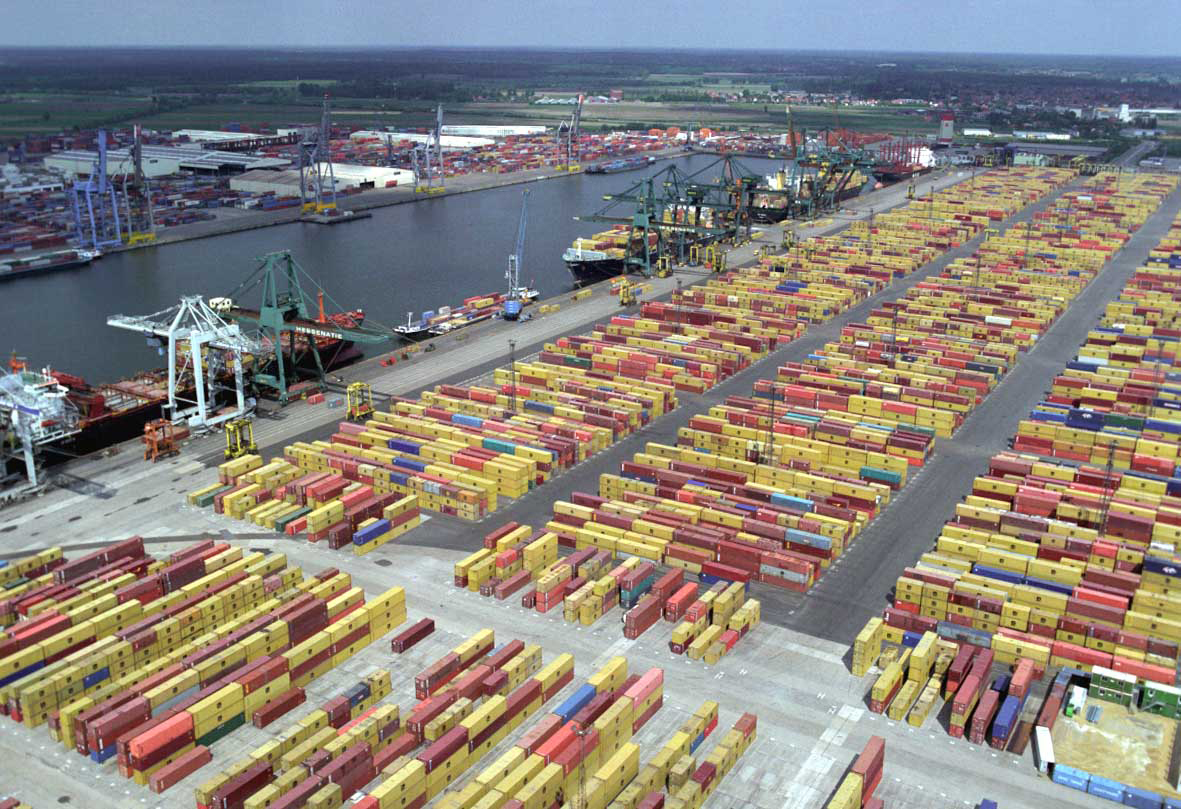
Port of Antwerp

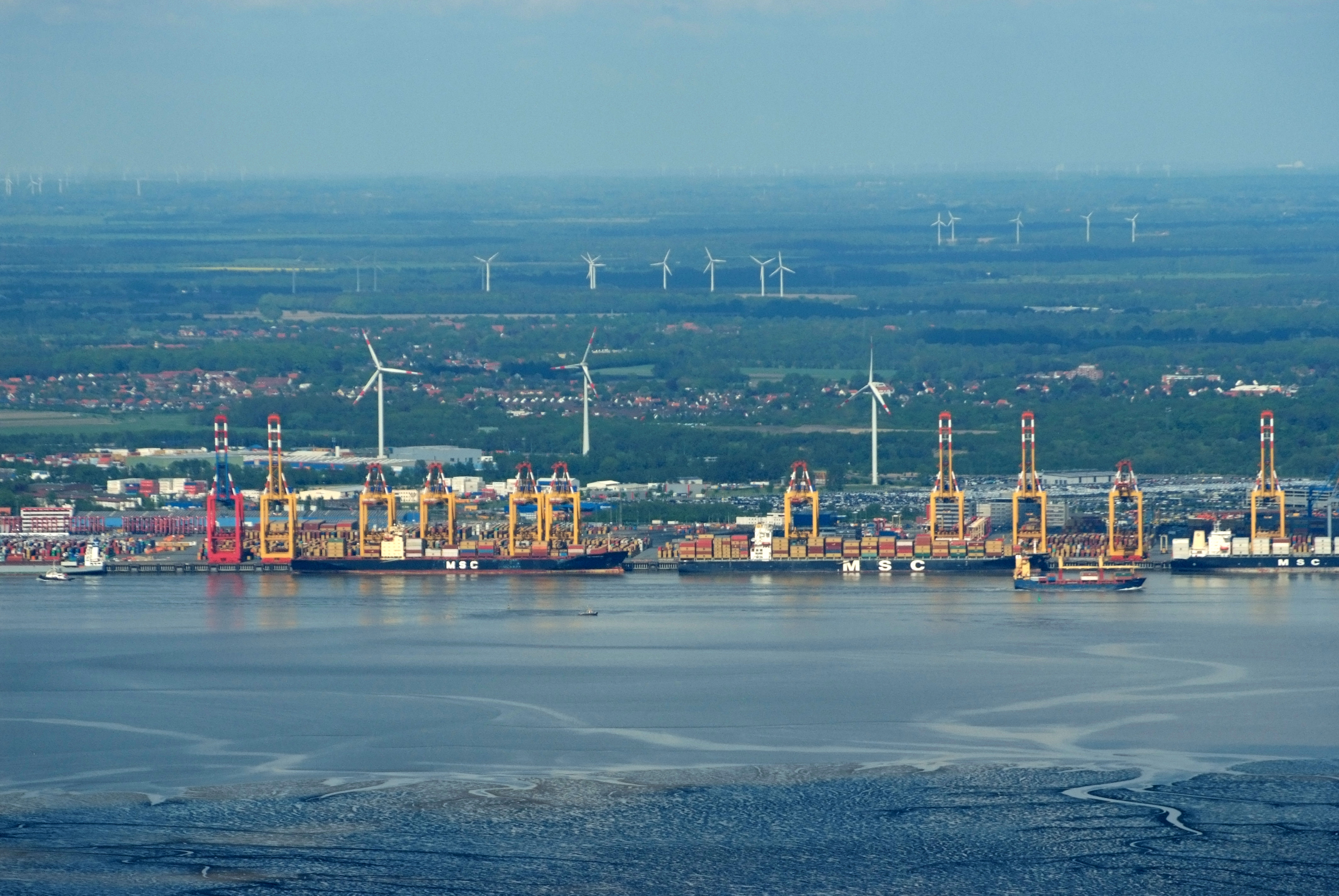
Port of Bremerhaven

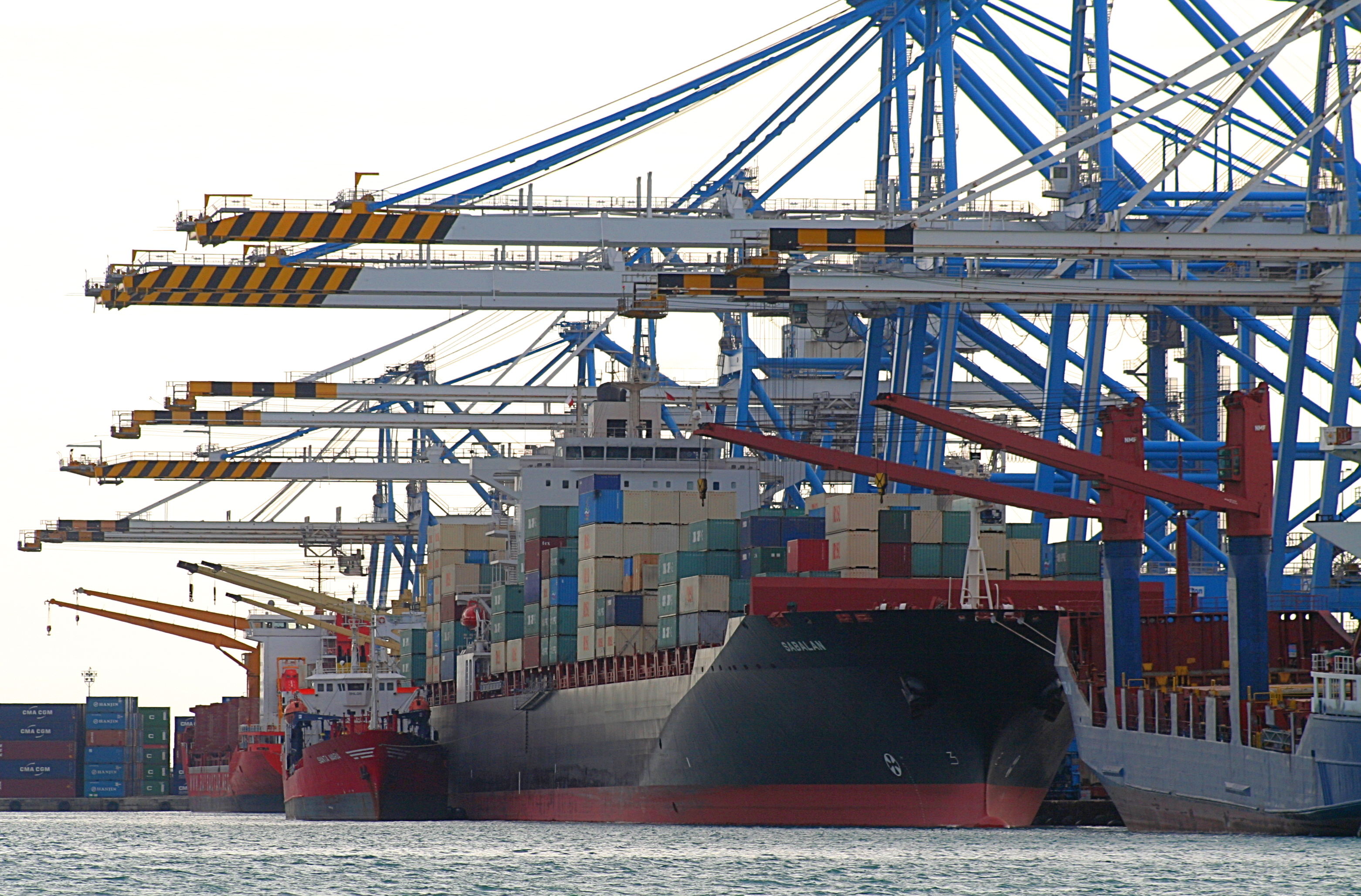
Malta Freeport

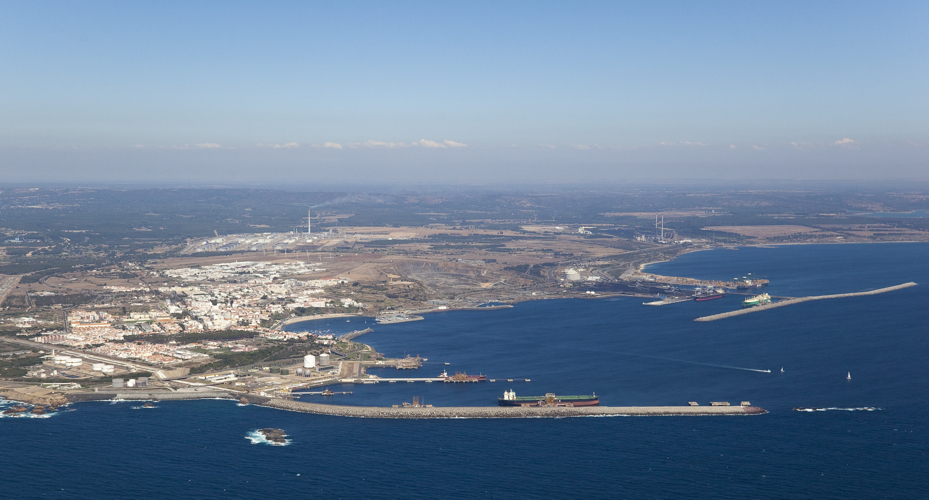
Port of Sines

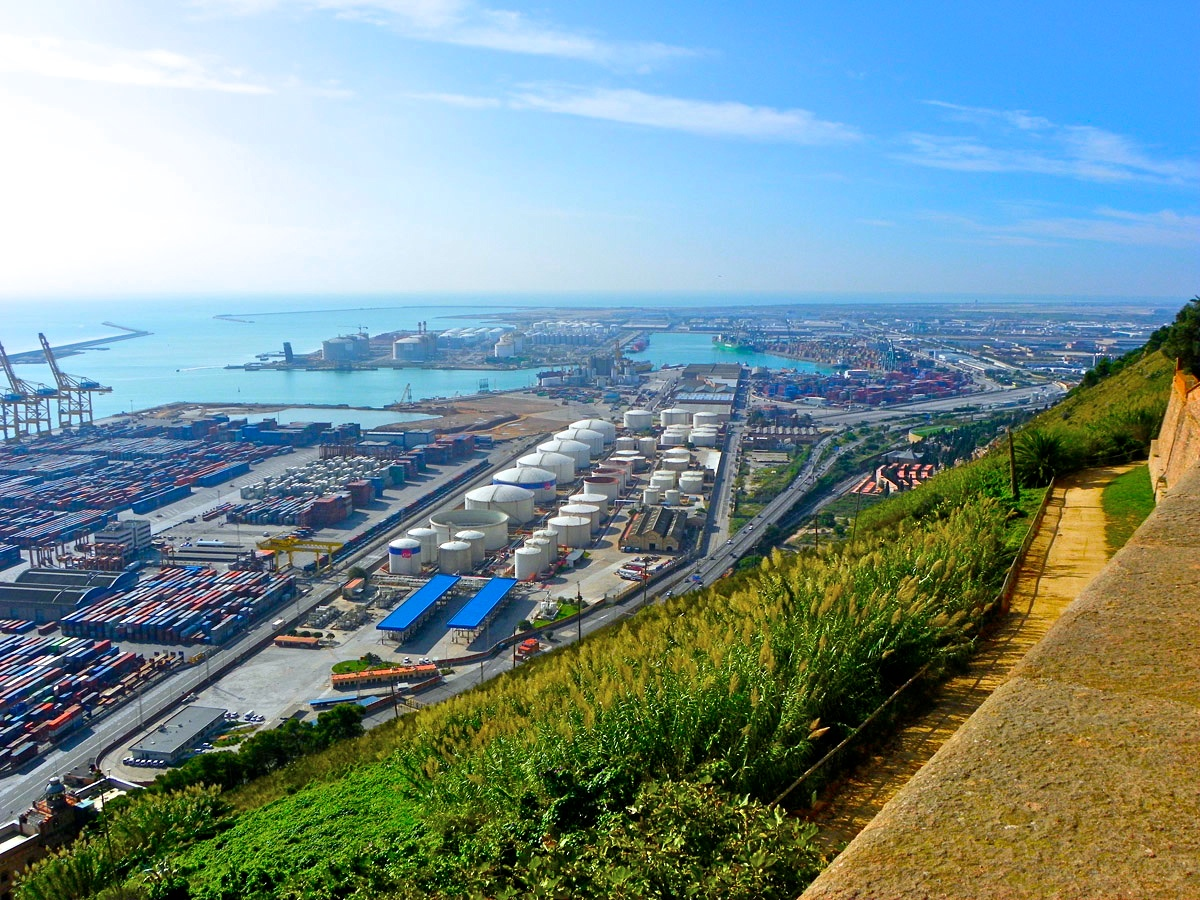
Port of Barcelona
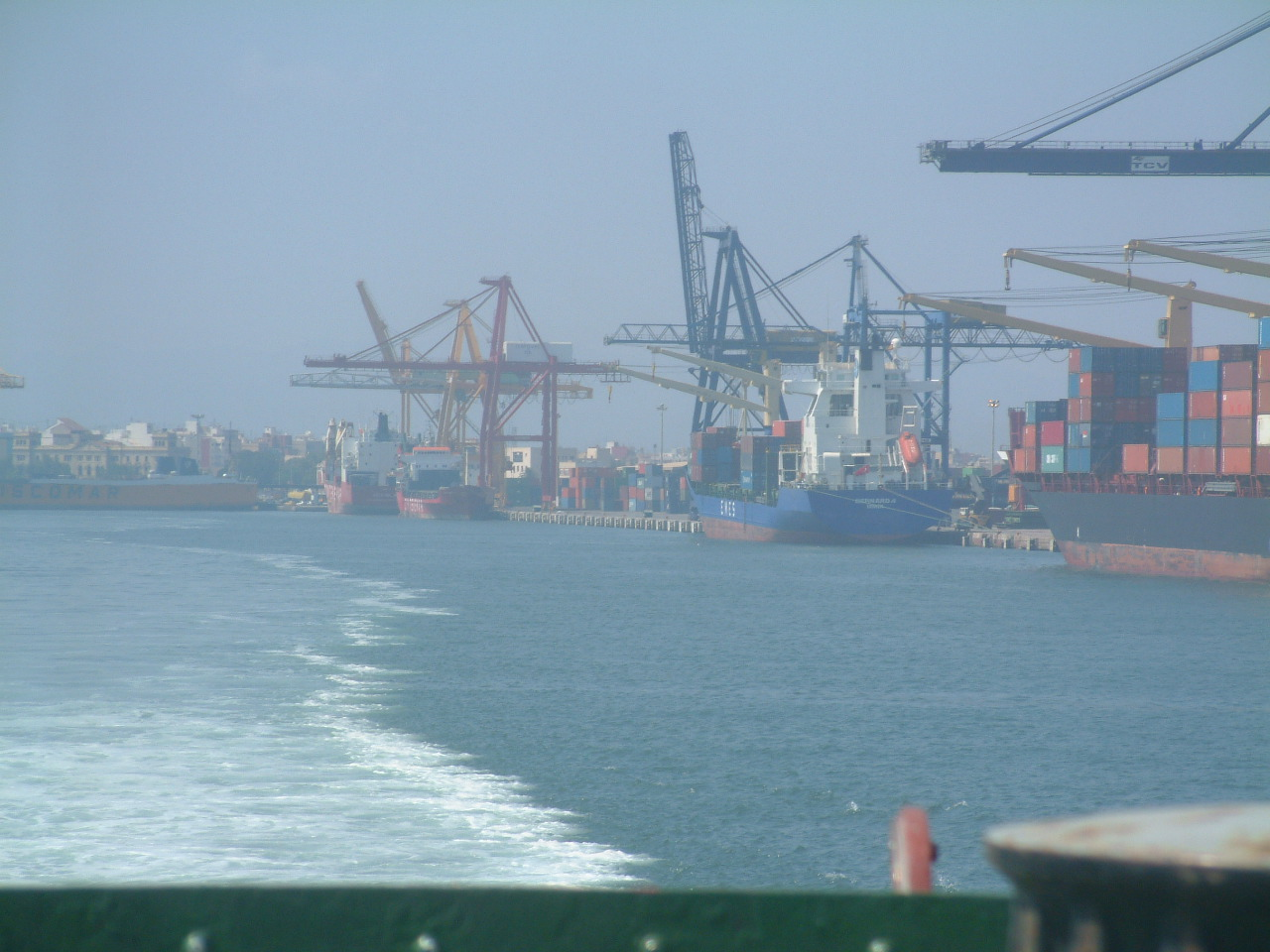
Port of Valencia

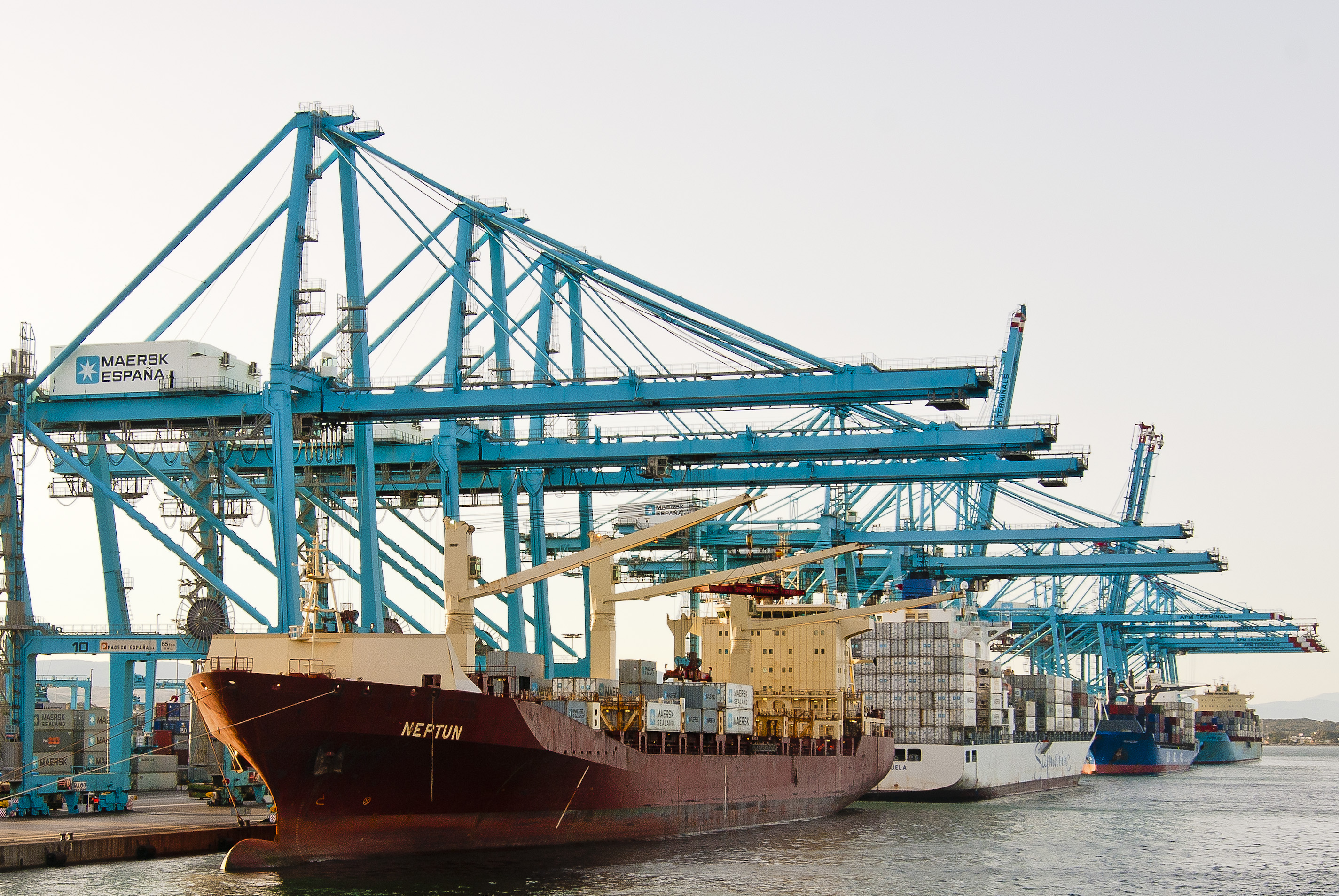
Port of Algeciras

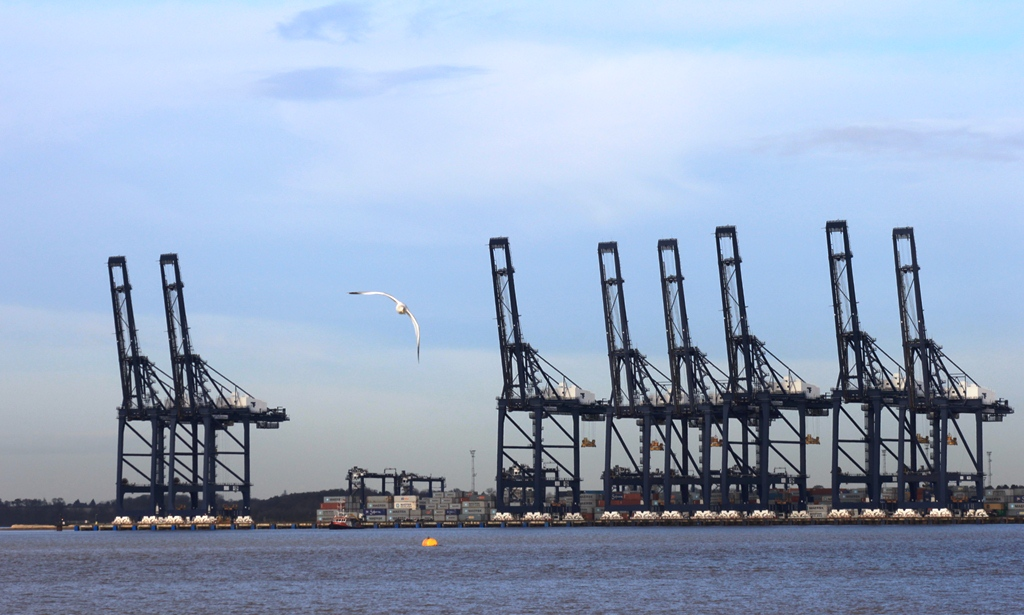
Port of Felixstowe

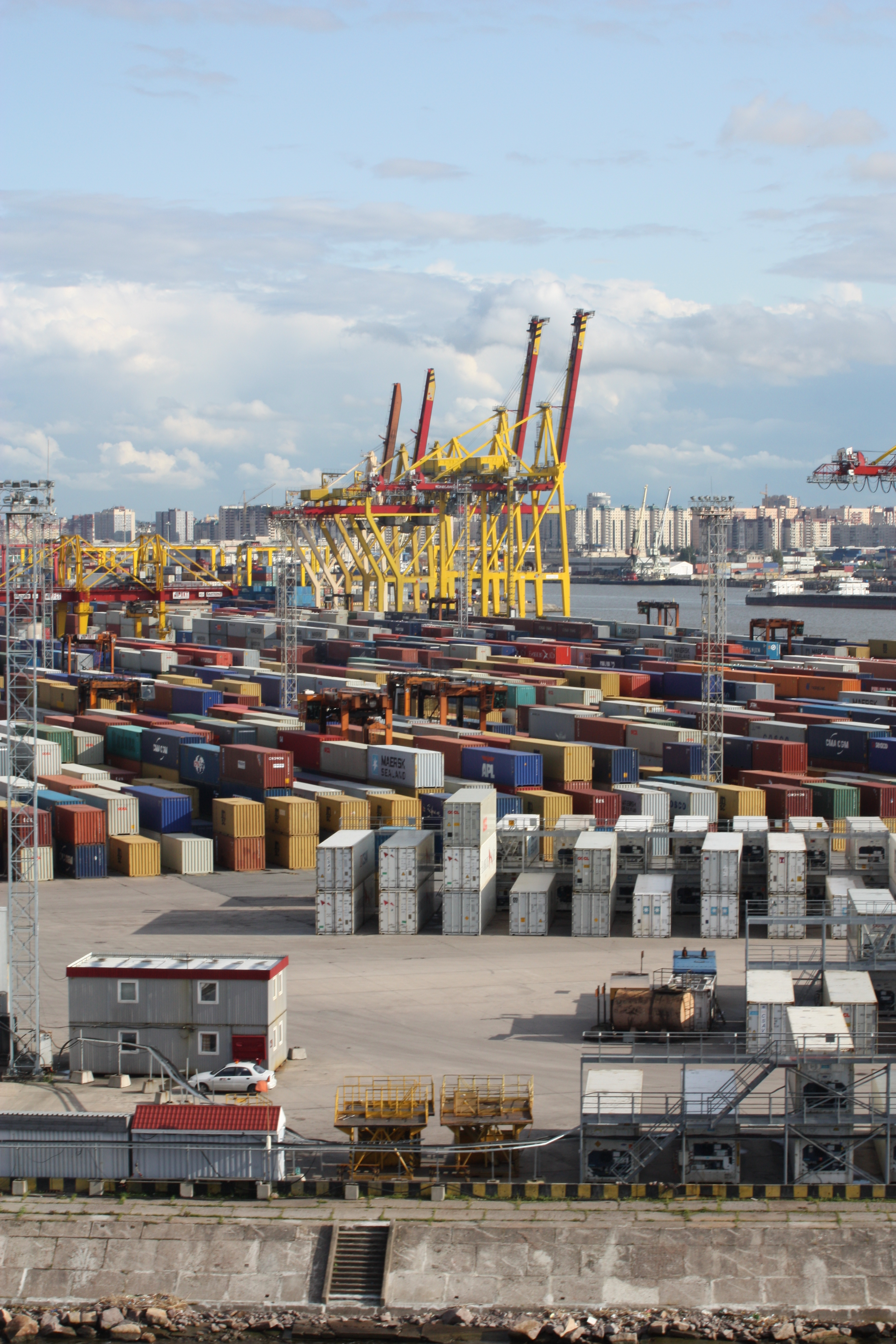
Port of Saint Petersburg

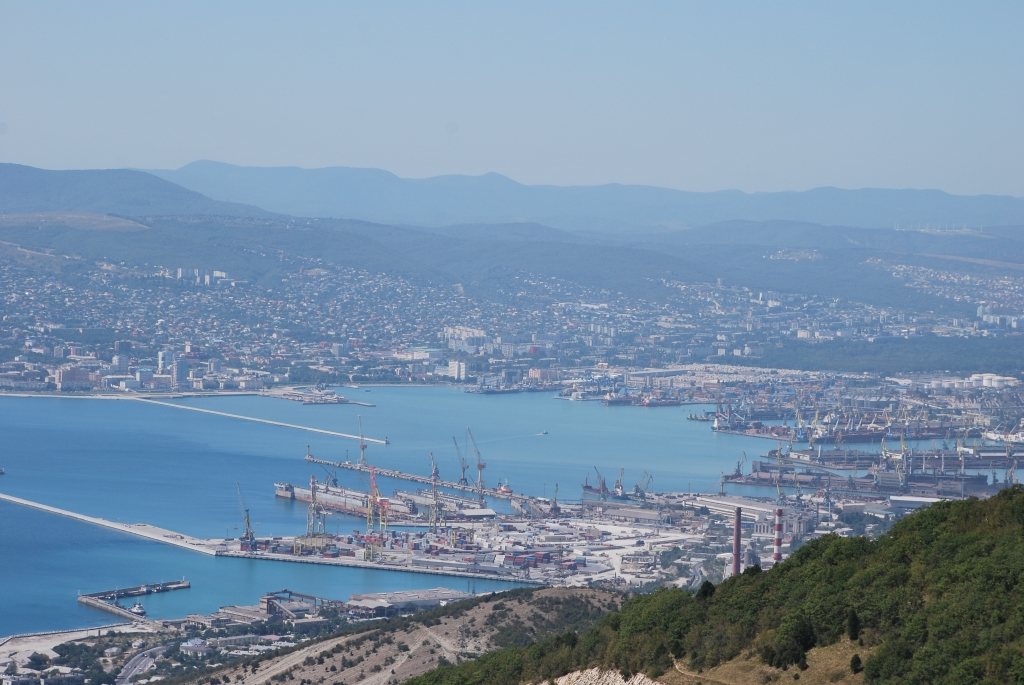
Port of Novorossiysk

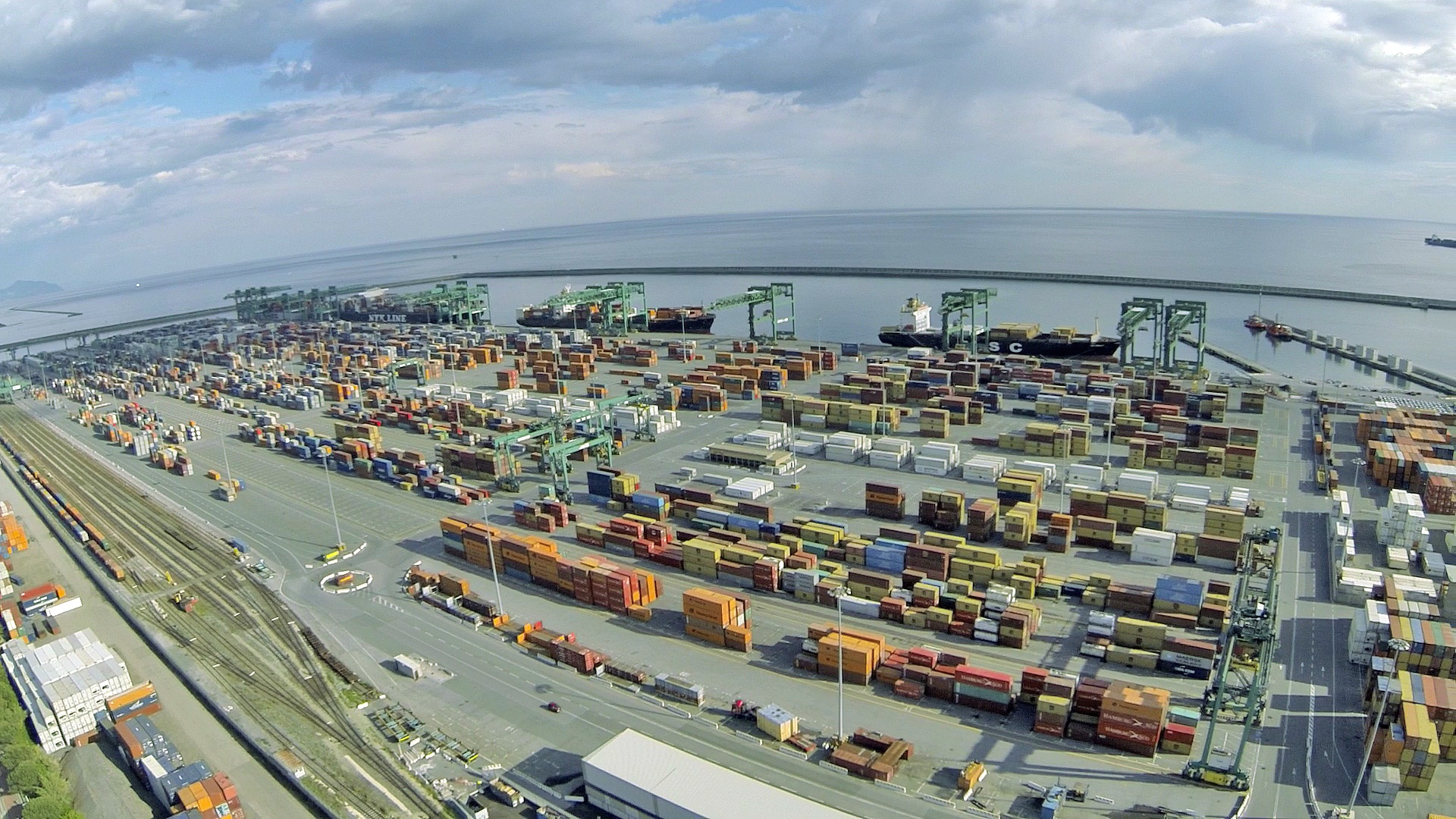
Port of Genoa

== See also ==
- List of busiest container ports
- List of busiest ports by cargo tonnage
