= Polígono Industrial Cortijo Real =

Coordinates: 36°6′44″N 5°28′18″W

Polígono Industrial Cortijo Real is an industrial estate in the southwestern suburbs of Algeciras, southeastern Spain. Nico Reparaciones Navales SA, Mediterráneo SA, Recomar SA, Lozano, Ivesur, MD Nautica SL, Talleres Barberans, Sofrial, Autransa, Algesonitc, and Sea Land Traders International all have warehouses here. Several of the firms based in Polígono manufacture containers for shipment to the nearby Port of Algeciras, such as Mediterráneo SA, also known as Comesa (Containers del Mediterraneo) and are generally mechanical firms.
