= Isla Verde Lighthouse =

Isla Verde Lighthouse Faro de Isla Verde
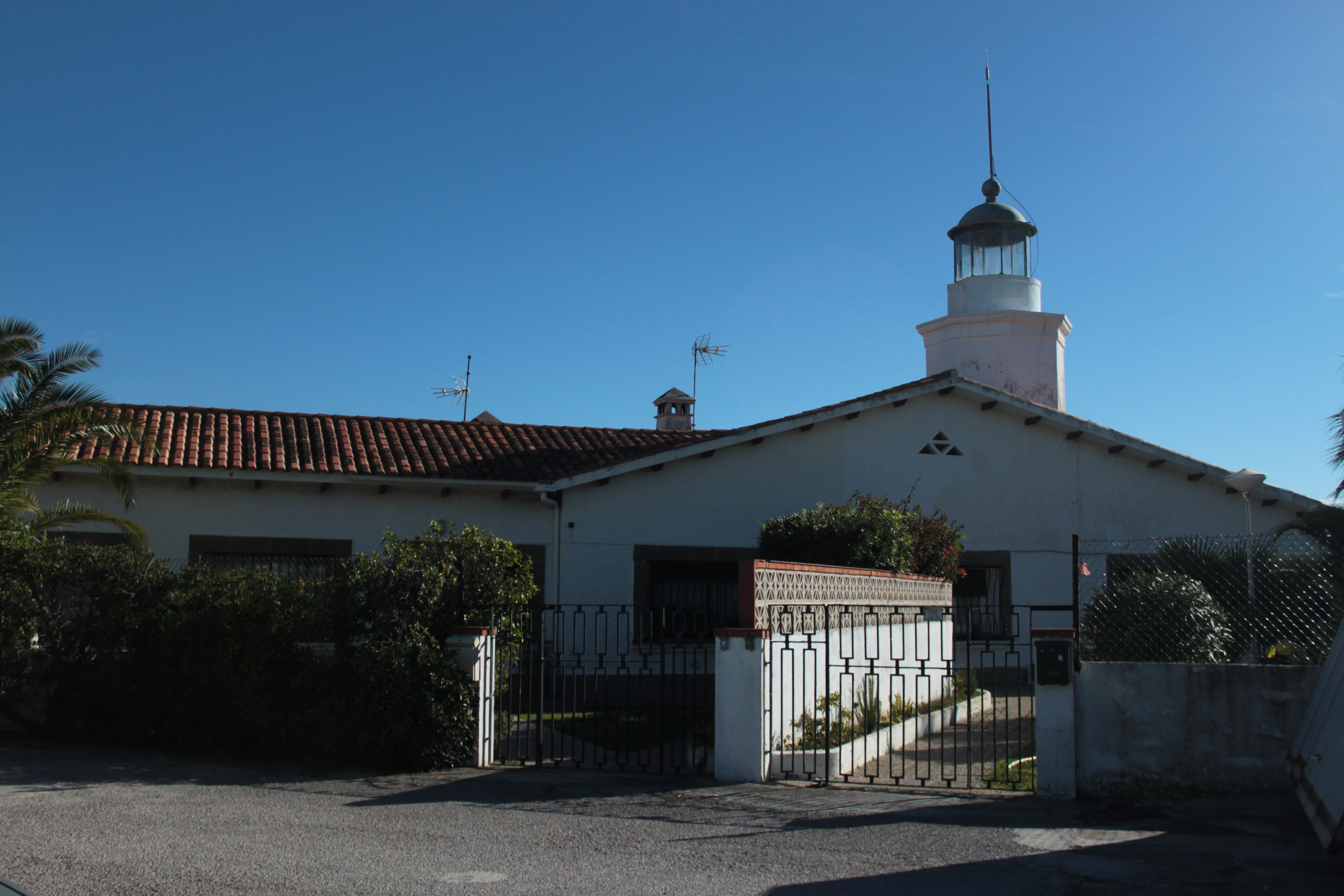
- Location: Algeciras; Andalusia; Spain
- Coordinates: 36°07′21.8″N 5°26′02.2″W

Tower
- Constructed: 1864
- Construction: masonry tower
- Height: 9 metres (30 ft)
- Shape: octagonal prism towe with balcony and lantern rising from one-storey keeper’s house
- Markings: white tower, grey lantern dome

Light
- Deactivated: 1980s

Lighthouse of Isla Verde (Spanish: Faro de Isla Verde) is an inactive lighthouse in Algeciras, Spain. It is located at the southern end of an old fort, on Isla Verde, an island that has been incorporated into the Port of Algeciras. The lighthouse was designed and built by Jaime Font in 1863 and inaugurated in 1864. It is a polygonal stone tower, plastered with lime. The focal plane is 26 m above mean sea level and 9 m above the ground. Today the lighthouse is not in service as it has been replaced by beacons at the port.

== See also ==
- List of lighthouses in Spain
