= Playa de El Chinarral =

Beach in Algeciras, Spain

Coordinates: 36°06′44″N 5°26′12″W

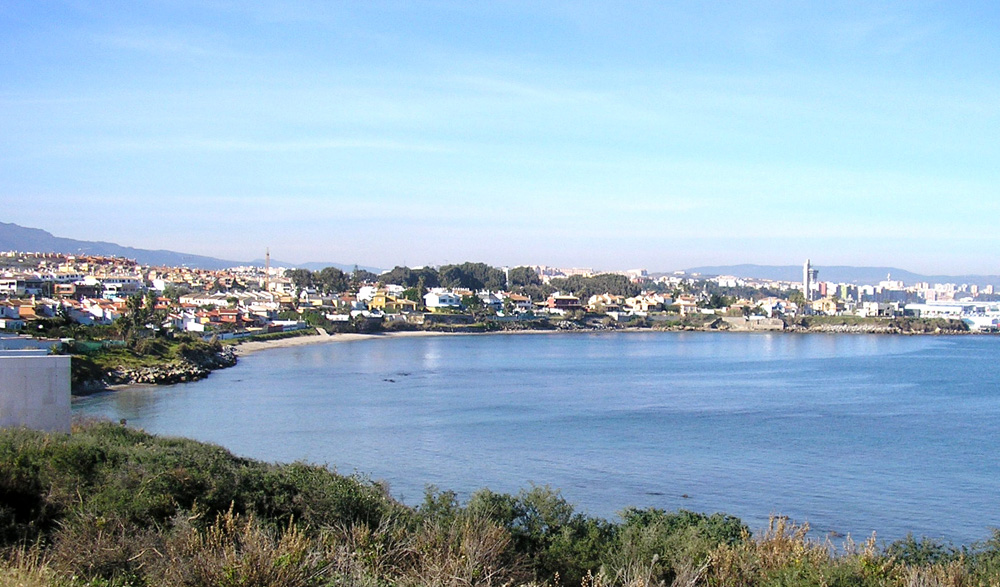

Playa de El Chinarral is a beach in the municipality of Algeciras, southeastern Spain. It overlooks the Bay of Algeciras and the tip of the rock of Gibraltar. It is approximately 250 metres in length and 40 metres wide on average. It is located between Punta de San Garcia and El Rodeo, south of the city.

The beach has fine sand and calm waters sheltered by a small cove. The bottom of the water is largely rocky reefs, very dangerous for navigation. It continues north to an area of cliffs and the basin of the Port of Algeciras. The area is rarely visited due to its small size and difficult access, surrounded by private houses.
