= Moldauhafen =

Lot in the port of Hamburg, Germany

Coordinates: 53°31′44″N 10°0′54″E

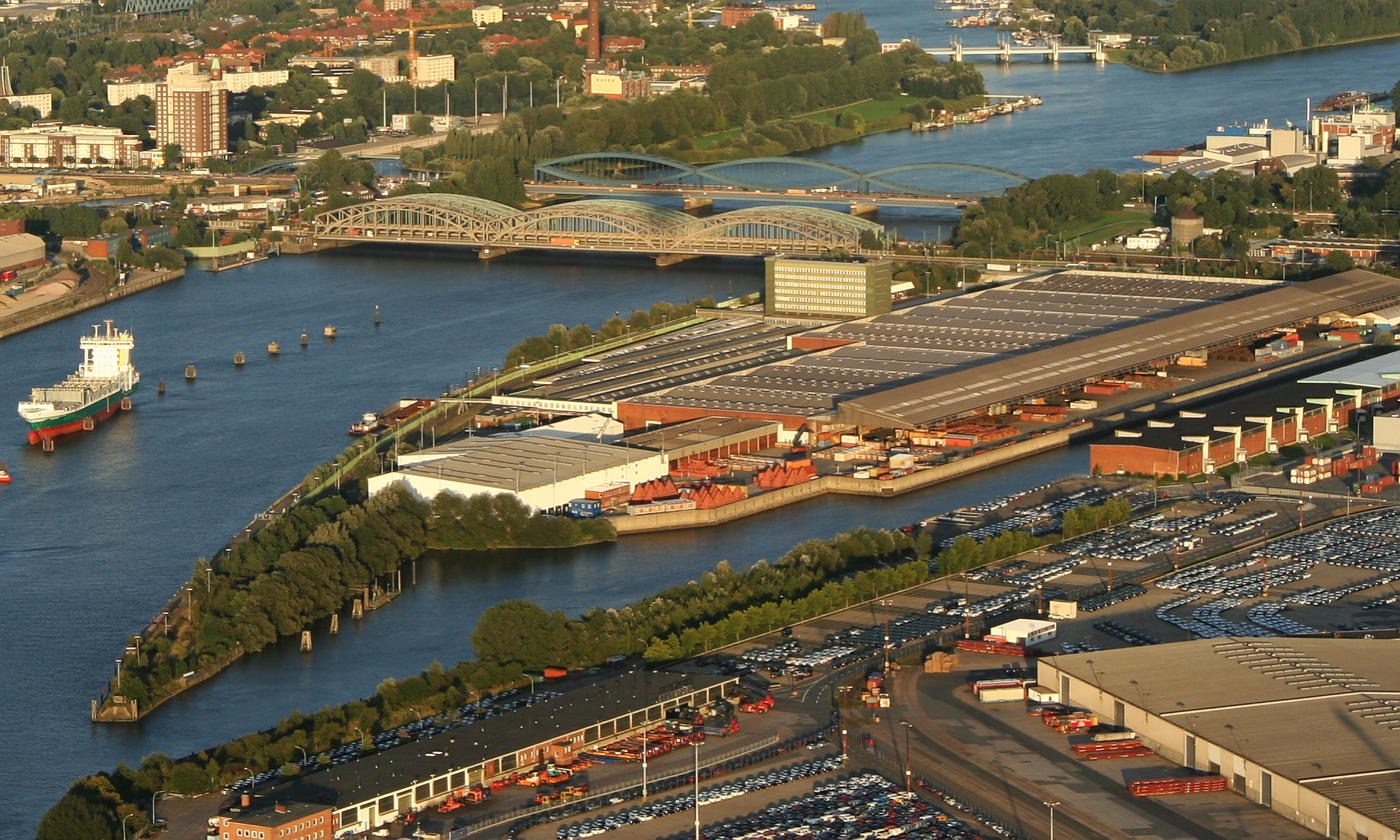
Moldauhafen from the air

Moldauhafen is a lot in the port of Hamburg, Germany, that Czechoslovakia acquired on a 99-year lease in 1929 pursuant to the Treaty of Versailles. In 1993, the Czech Republic received the right to the port after the dissolution of Czechoslovakia. The lease will expire in 2028. The lot (the name of which is German for "Vltava port") gives the Czech Republic access to the sea via the Vltava and Elbe rivers.

Previously, a similar arrangement existed for the port of Stettin, now Szczecin, Poland.

The lot is one of three over which the Czech Republic has rights. The other two are Saalehafen and Peutehafen. Saalehafen comes under the Versailles Treaty, but then-Czechoslovakia purchased Peutehafen in 1929. Both Moldauhafen and Saalehafen are part of the Hamburg free port, and sit on the embankment of Dresdner Ufer and Hallesches Ufer. The area comprises about 28,500 square metres (306,771 sq ft). The leased premises constitute a duty-free zone that were called the Czecho-Slovak rental zone for inland navigation in the free port of Hamburg.

Peutehafen comprises an area of about 13,500 square metres (145,313 sq ft). It lies on the narrow peninsula between the Peutekanal and the Peutehafen dock, and is just outside the Hamburg free port.

== Recent developments ==
In 2004, the city of Hamburg expressed interest in acquiring the two leased areas, as its proposed plan for hosting the 2024 Summer Olympics would have blocked access to Moldauhafen. The city also desired to develop the two areas. The city offered the Czech Republic a new site in exchange, with the inducement of a better location. For its part, the Czech Republic wished to continue to use its ports in Hamburg even after the expiration of the 99-year leases.

== History ==
The 1919 Treaty of Versailles stated in articles 363 and 364:

Article 363

In the ports of Hamburg and Stettin Germany shall lease to the Czecho-Slovak State, for a period of 99 years, areas which shall be placed under the general regime of free zones and shall be used for the direct transit of goods coming from or going to that State.

Article 364

The delimitation of these areas, and their equipment, their exploitation, and in general all conditions for their utilisation, including the amount of the rental, shall be decided by a Commission consisting of one delegate of Germany, one delegate of the Czecho-Slovak State and one delegate of Great Britain. These conditions shall be susceptible of revision every ten years in the same manner. Germany declares in advance that she will adhere to the decisions so taken.

The deal thus allowed the landlocked country free ports where goods transported over the Vltava and the Elbe or the Oder, respectively, could be transferred to seagoing ships in Hamburg or Stettin without the interference of a third state.

Even though Germany had already declared in advance that it would follow the decisions of the Commission, the lease was formalised in an agreement between Germany and Czechoslovakia, signed in Prague on 16 February 1929.

With the abandonment of the Treaty of Versailles after World War II, the lease now has the character of a private contract between the city of Hamburg as property owner and the Czech Republic.
