= Port of Świnoujście =

Seaport in Poland

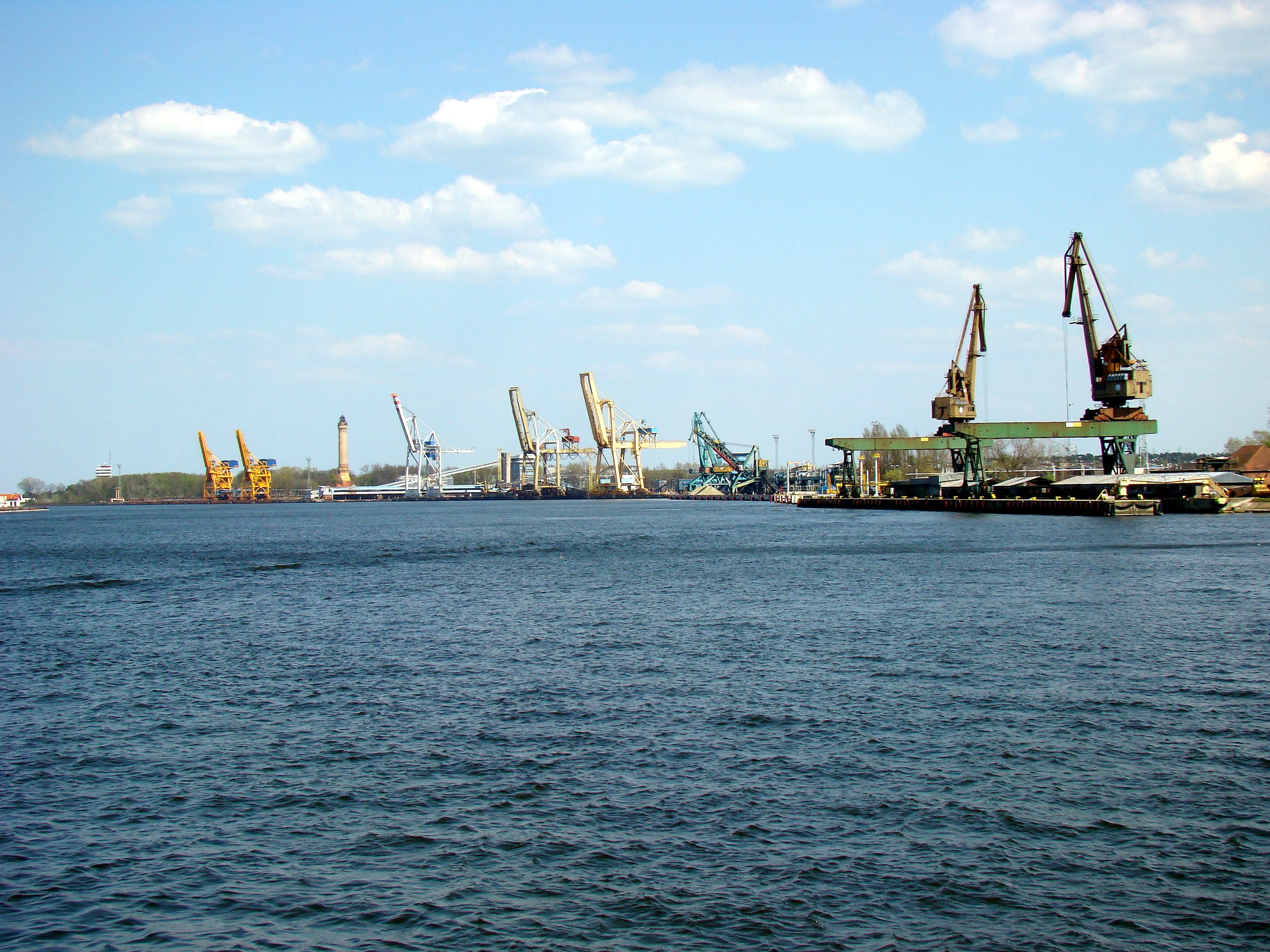
- Reloading cargo wharf
- Interactive map of Port of Świnoujście

Location
- Country: Poland
- Location: Świnoujście
- Coordinates: 53°54′11″N 14°15′05″E
- UN/LOCODE: PLSWI

Details
- Operated by: Szczecin and Świnoujscie Seaports Authority
- Owned by: Government of Poland

Statistics
- Vessel arrivals: 6,265 (2022)
- Annual cargo tonnage: 19,997,900 (2022)
- Annual container volume: 1,081 (2022)
- Passenger traffic: 1,160,832 (2022)
- Website; Szczecin and Świnoujscie Seaports Authority

The Port of Świnoujście (in Polish generally Port Świnoujście) is a Polish seaport in Świnoujście, Poland on the Baltic Sea located at the Świna strait, on Wolin and Usedom islands. The port has a passenger terminal.

In 2022, cargo traffic in the seaport equaled 19,997,900 tons, comprising 16,8% of all cargo traffic in Polish seaports and the port was entered by 6265 ships with gross tonnage of more than 100.

The Ports of Świnoujście and Szczecin are managed by a single authority, creating Port of Szczecin-Świnoujście, the 6th largest port complex of the Baltic Sea.

== See also ==
- Port of Szczecin-Świnoujście
- Ports of the Baltic Sea
