= Pra' =

Municipality of Genoa

- Quartiere
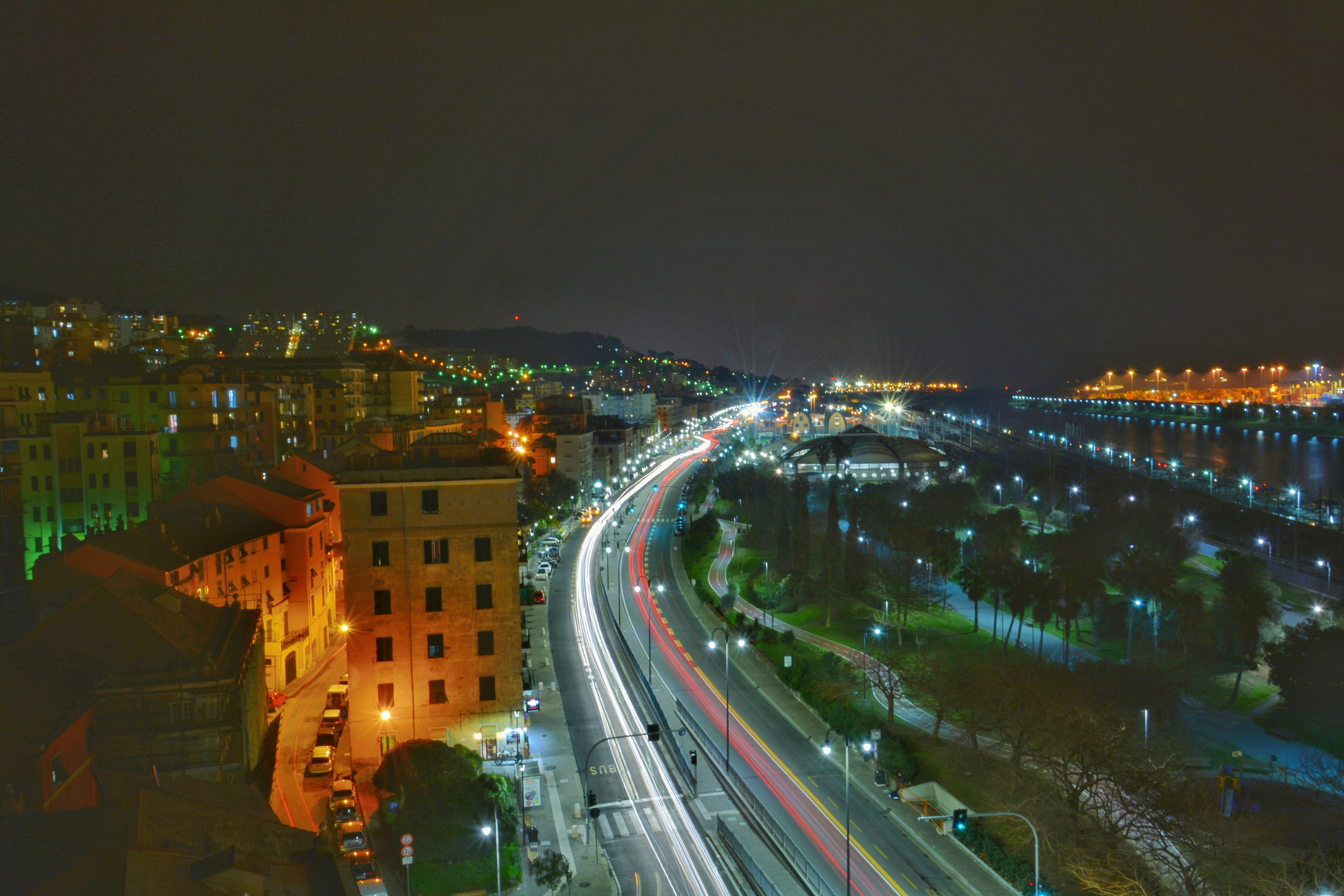
- Nighttime panorama

- Location in Italy
- Coordinates: 44°25′36″N 8°47′27″E
- Country: Italy
- Region: Liguria
- Province: Province of Genoa
- Comune: Genoa

Area
  - Total: 18.5 km^{2} (7.1 sq mi)

Population (2017)
  - Total: 20,025
- Demonyms: pràeso, -a or praíno, -a; Ligurian dialect: praín
- Postal code: 16157
- Area code: 010

Pra' (elision of the original Latin name Prata Veituriorum) is a western neighbourhood of Genoa, located between Pegli and Voltri with which it forms the western (Ponente) district of Genoa, Municipio VII.

The inhabitants of Pra' are called praesi in Italian; however, natives of the locality prefer to be called praíni (from Genoese praín).

Pra' was an autonomous municipality from 1797 to 1926, and was divided into five hamlets called casali: Torre, Pra' (later Borgo Foce), Sapello, Palmaro and Palmaro Carbone. In 1926, with the creation of Greater Genoa through the incorporation of nineteen municipalities by the Fascist regime, Pra' was added to the municipality of Genoa.
