= Port of Helsingborg =

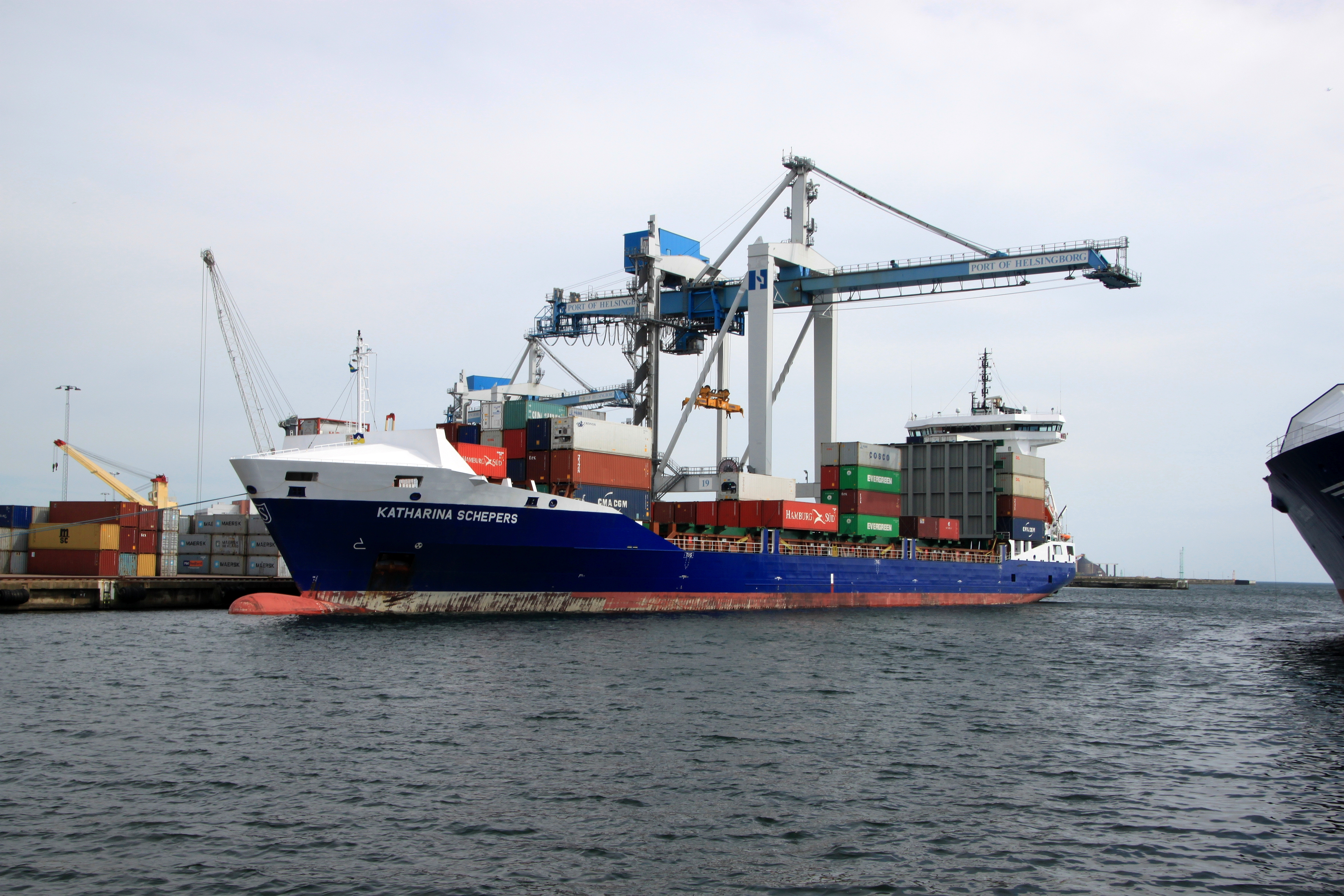

Location
- Country: Sweden
- Location: Helsingborg
- Coordinates: 56°02′17″N 12°41′38″E

Details
- Owned by: City of Helsingborg
- Draft depth: 12.3 metres (40 ft) (Maximum)
- Water depth: 13.5 metres (44 ft)

Statistics
- Annual cargo tonnage: 7.36 million tonnes (2023)
- Annual container volume: 2,35,000 TEUs (2023)

Port of Helsingborg is a port on the Øresund coast. Until the 18th century, the port operated with wooden jetties. The port consists of 3 lock-free dock systems—North Harbour, West Harbour, and South Harbour. The greatest depth of water is observed in the South Harbour of the port, where the maximum depth is 13.5 m and the port is capable of docking vessels up to 230 m long.

The port mainly transports bulk cargoes and containers; as of 2023, the port was able to handle 7.361 million tonnes of cargo, and 2,75,000 TEUs container. It is the sixth largest port in Sweden, and the second largest container port after the Port of Gothenburg.
