= Port of Szczecin-Świnoujście =

Seaport in Poland

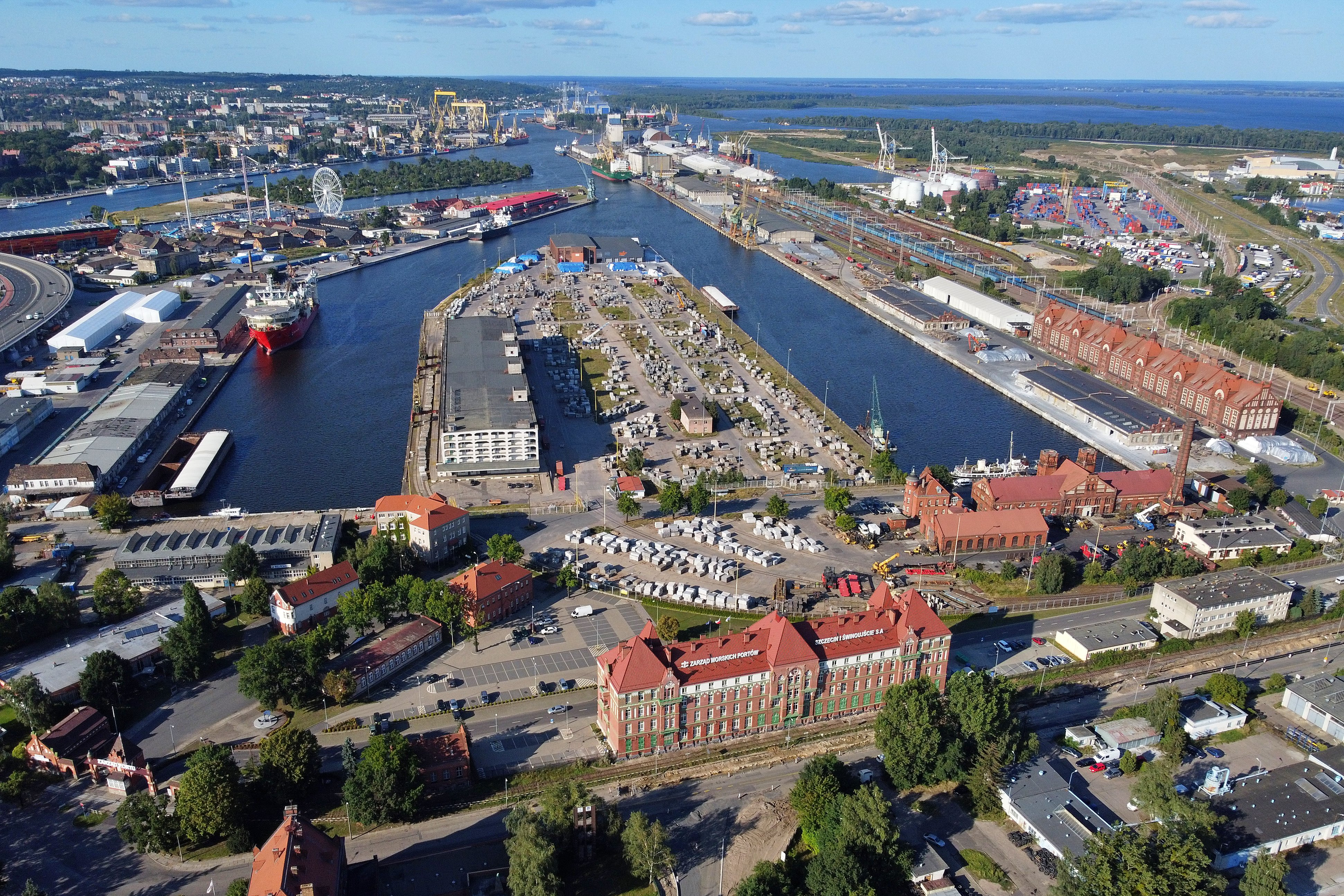
- General cargo handling area in the Port of Szczecin (2021)

- Click on the map for a fullscreen view

Location
- Country: Poland
- Location: Szczecin, Świnoujście
- Coordinates: 53°25′33″N 14°34′35″E
- UN/LOCODE: PLSZZ; PLSWI

Details
- Opened: 1977
- Operated by: Szczecin and Świnoujscie Seaports Authority
- Owned by: Government of Poland
- Size: 1600 ha

Statistics
- Annual cargo tonnage: 35,322,700 (2023)
- Annual container volume: 67,592 (2023)
- Passenger traffic: 1,165,738 (2022)
- Website; Szczecin and Świnoujscie Seaports Authority

The Port of Szczecin-Świnoujście (in Polish generally Port Szczecin-Świnoujście [ˈpɔrt ʂt͡ʂɛt͡ɕin-ɕfinɔˈujɕt͡ɕɛ]) is a Polish seaport complex in cities of Szczecin and Świnoujście, within northwestern part of West Pomeranian Voivodeship, Poland.

The complex was created in 1977 by a merger of two ports, namely Port of Szczecin and Port of Świnoujście.

It serves containers, liquid and dry bulk, gas, RoRo cargo and project shipments and holds an important ferry terminal, connecting Scandinavia with the southern coast of the Baltic Sea.

In 2023, cargo traffic in the seaport equaled 35,322,700 tons, making it the 6th largest port complex of the Baltic Sea.

== See also ==
- Port of Szczecin
- Port of Świnoujście
- Ports of the Baltic Sea
