= Port of Kergroise =

Commercial port in France

Coordinates: 47.735°N 3.360°W

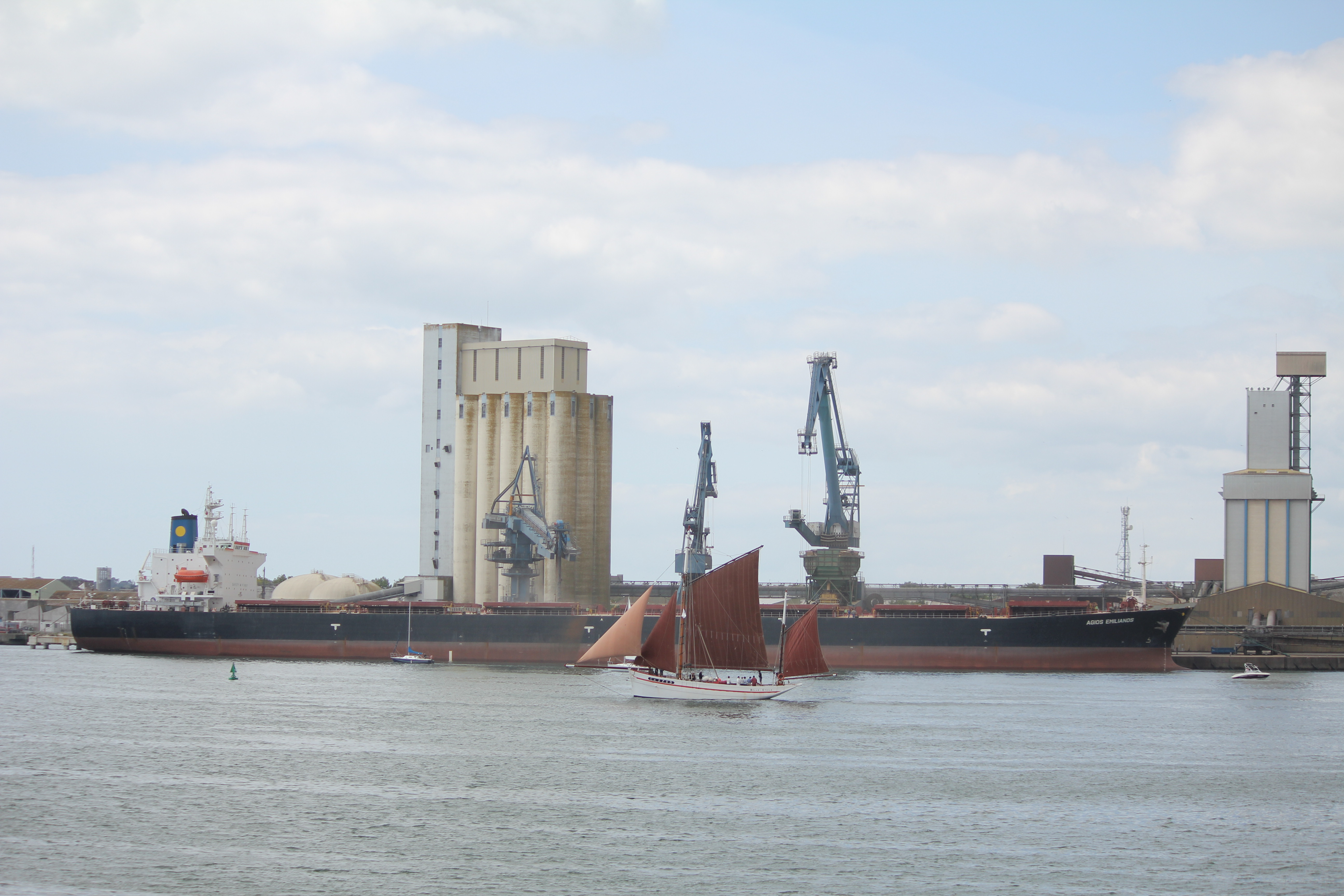
Boat unloading at the agri-food terminal in 2010.

The Port of Kergroise is a commercial port located in the district of Kergroise, Lorient, on the south coast of Brittany, France. It is owned by the Region of Brittany since 2007 and managed by the Chamber of Commerce and Industry of Morbihan. Based on the annual tonnage processed, it is ranked as the 14th most important commercial port in France.

== History ==
=== Creation of the first quay at Kergroise ===
The harbors and arsenals of Lorient experienced modernization through the 19th century, a period that converted Lorient into a naval base. In 1889, arsenal workshops in Lorient transitioned from cast iron into cast steel production, which required increasing the amount of coal. In order to meet this demand, the city started trading with Wales, from where its coal was imported for the city's steam engines and from which maritime pine timber from Lorient was exported for shoring up Welsh mines, thus allowing the city to balance up its trade.

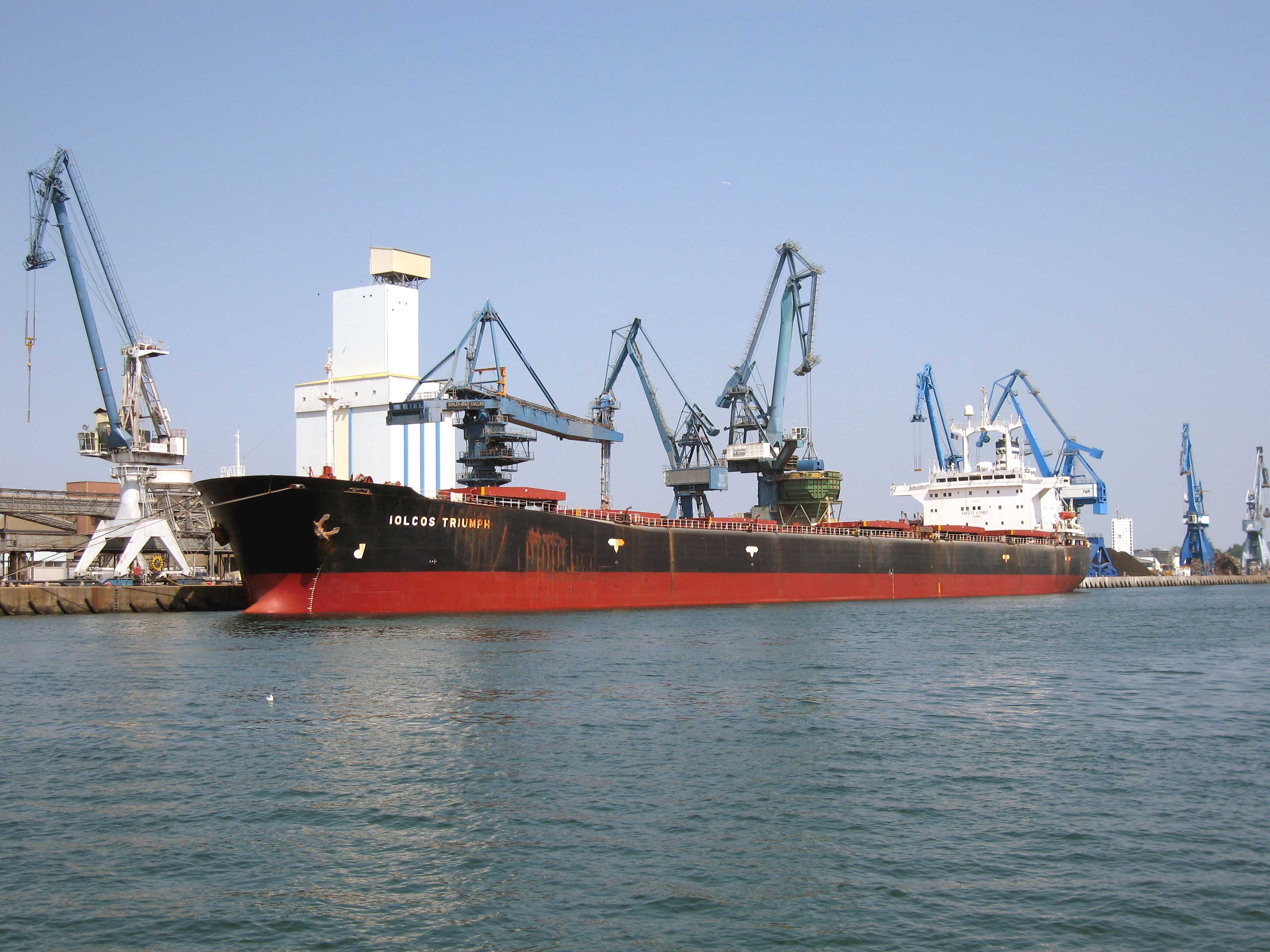
Bulk cargo ship unloading soybean meal from Brazil.

Built in 1910, it was expanded during the post-war reconstruction of the city. The docks were once again expanded in the 1970s and the installation of new equipment allowed it diversify. The access channel was dredged in the early 2010s, allowing easier access to Panamax size ships.

== Usage ==
The port's activities are mainly import-oriented, consisting of hydrocarbons, food products and construction materials. It is also occasionally used for passenger transport and for military vessels trading with the arsenal of Lorient.
