= Port of Szczecin =

Seaport in Poland

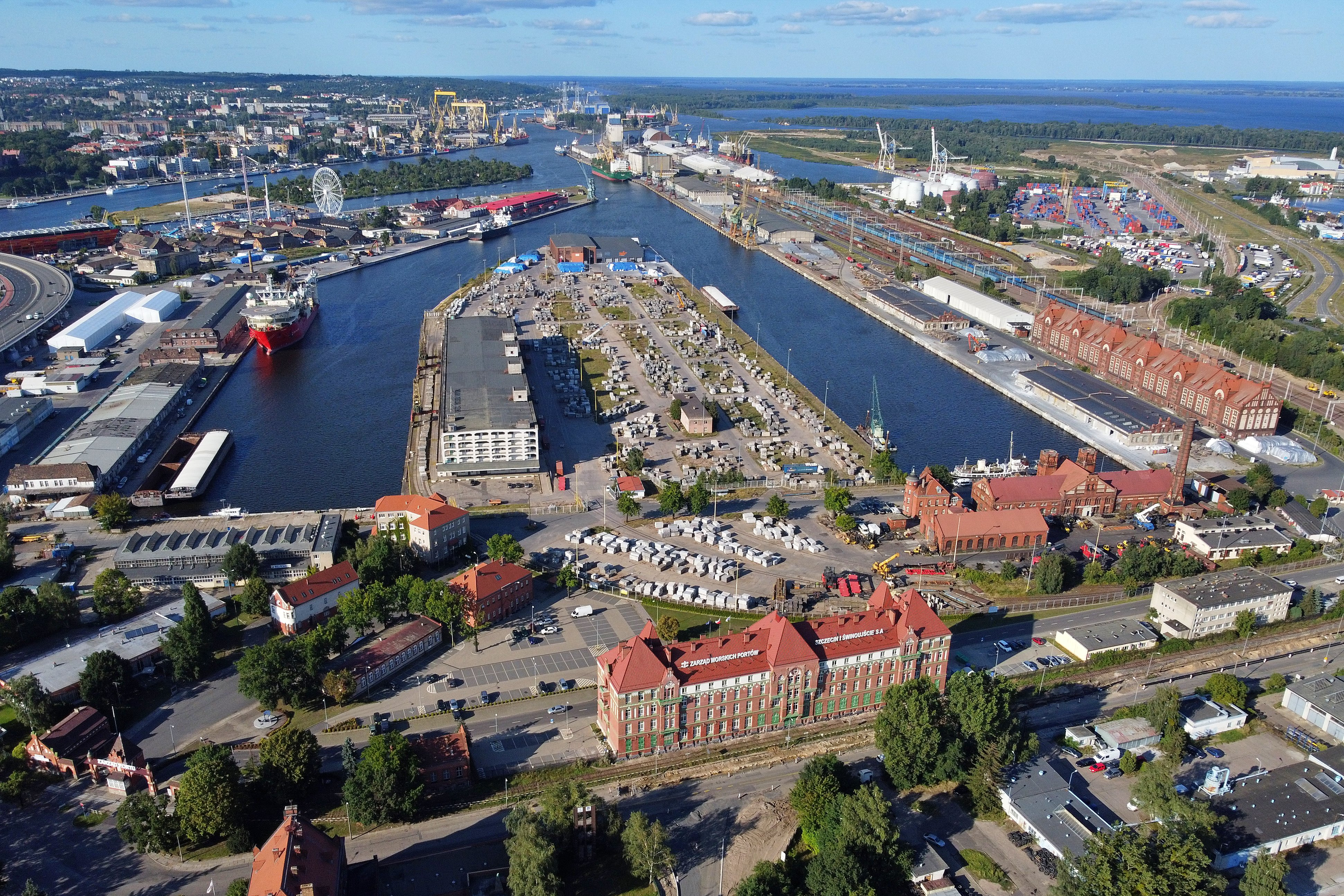
- General cargo handling area in the Port of Szczecin (2021)
- Click on the map for a fullscreen view

Location
- Country: Poland
- Location: Szczecin
- Coordinates: 53°25′33″N 14°34′35″E
- UN/LOCODE: PLSZZ

Details
- Opened: Middle Ages
- Operated by: Szczecin and Świnoujscie Seaports Authority
- Owned by: Government of Poland
- No. of wharfs: 103

Statistics
- Vessel arrivals: 3173 (2022)
- Annual cargo tonnage: 11,208,700 (2022)
- Annual container volume: 75,779 (2022)
- Passenger traffic: 4,906 (2022)
- Website; Szczecin and Świnoujscie Seaports Authority

The Port of Szczecin (in Polish generally Port Szczecin) is a Polish seaport and deep water harbour in Szczecin, Poland. It is located at the Oder and Regalica rivers in the Lower Oder Valley, off the Szczecin Lagoon. In the past, the port included the now defunct Szczecin Shipyard. A free trade zone has been designated within the port area.

In 2022, cargo traffic in the seaport equaled 11,208,700 tons, comprising 9,4% of all cargo traffic in Polish seaports and the port was entered by 3173 ships with gross tonnage of more than 100.

The Ports of Szczecin and Świnoujście are managed by a single authority, creating Port of Szczecin-Świnoujście, the 6th largest port complex of the Baltic Sea.

== History ==
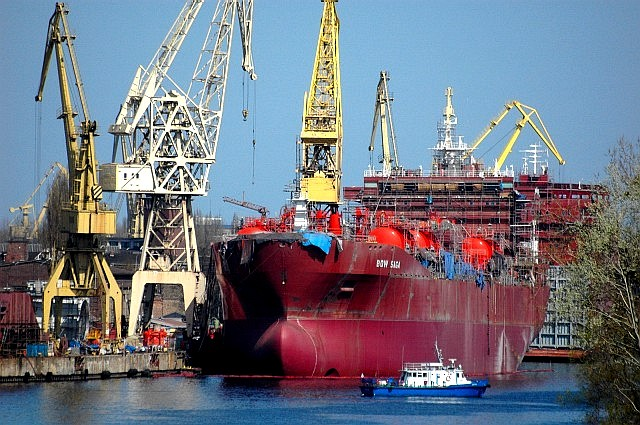
Szczecin Shipyard (2007)

By the Treaty of Versailles the navigation on the Oder became subject to international agreements, and following its articles 363 and 364 Czechoslovakia was entitled to lease in Stettin (now Szczecin) its own harbour bassin, then called Tschechoslowakische Zone im Hafen Stettin (German: the Czechoslovak Zone in the Port of Stettin).

The contract of lease between Czechoslovakia and Germany, and supervised by the United Kingdom, was signed on February 16, 1929, and would end in 2028, however, after 1945 Czechoslovakia did not regain this legal position, de facto abolished in 1938/1939. A similar lease is still in effect for the Moldauhafen port in Hamburg until 2028.

In 1945, after Soviet capture of the German city and hand-over to the Polish on 5 July 1945, the port remained under Soviet control, and it was to take until 1955 that Poland would obtain complete authority over the port. The Red Army used the port to transact almost the complete maritime traffic containing spoils of war from the Soviet occupation zone of Germany to the Soviet Union because central German ports were much more damaged than Stettin's port. Particularly, in the Stettin area, parts of paper manufacturing plants from Stolzenhagen (today: Stołczyn) and Scholwin (today: Skolwin) as well as the Stoewer vehicle plant were dismantled and shipped via the port. In July 1945 22,000 German forced laborer worked in the port. Also later, German specialists working in the port were exempt from expulsion. The reason was that because inter-war Poland had only a very short coast, there were not sufficiently many Polish harbor specialists to operate the port.

== See also ==
- Port of Szczecin-Świnoujście
- Ports of the Baltic Sea
