= Ports in Frankfurt am Main =

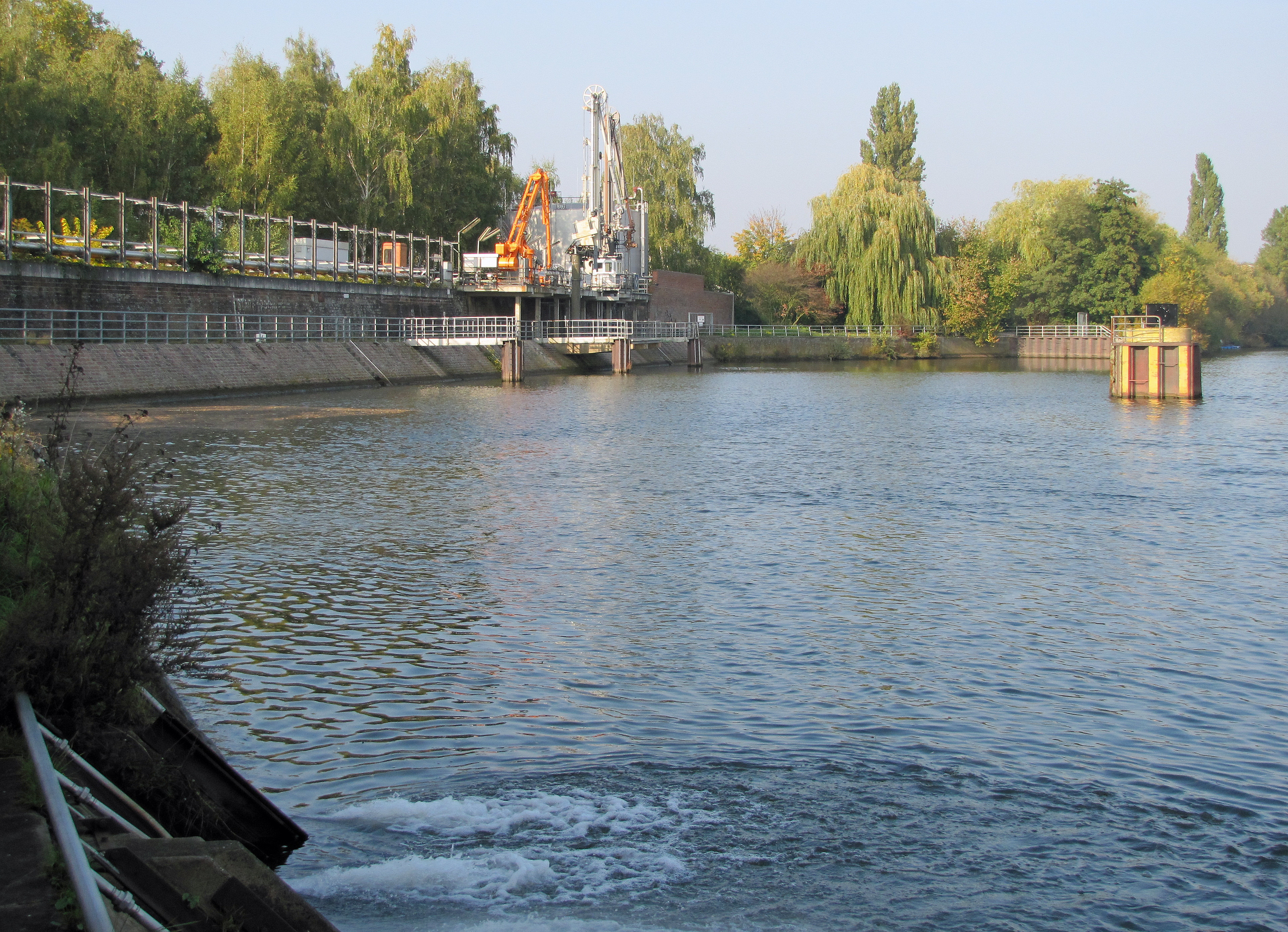
AllessaChemie, Mainkur

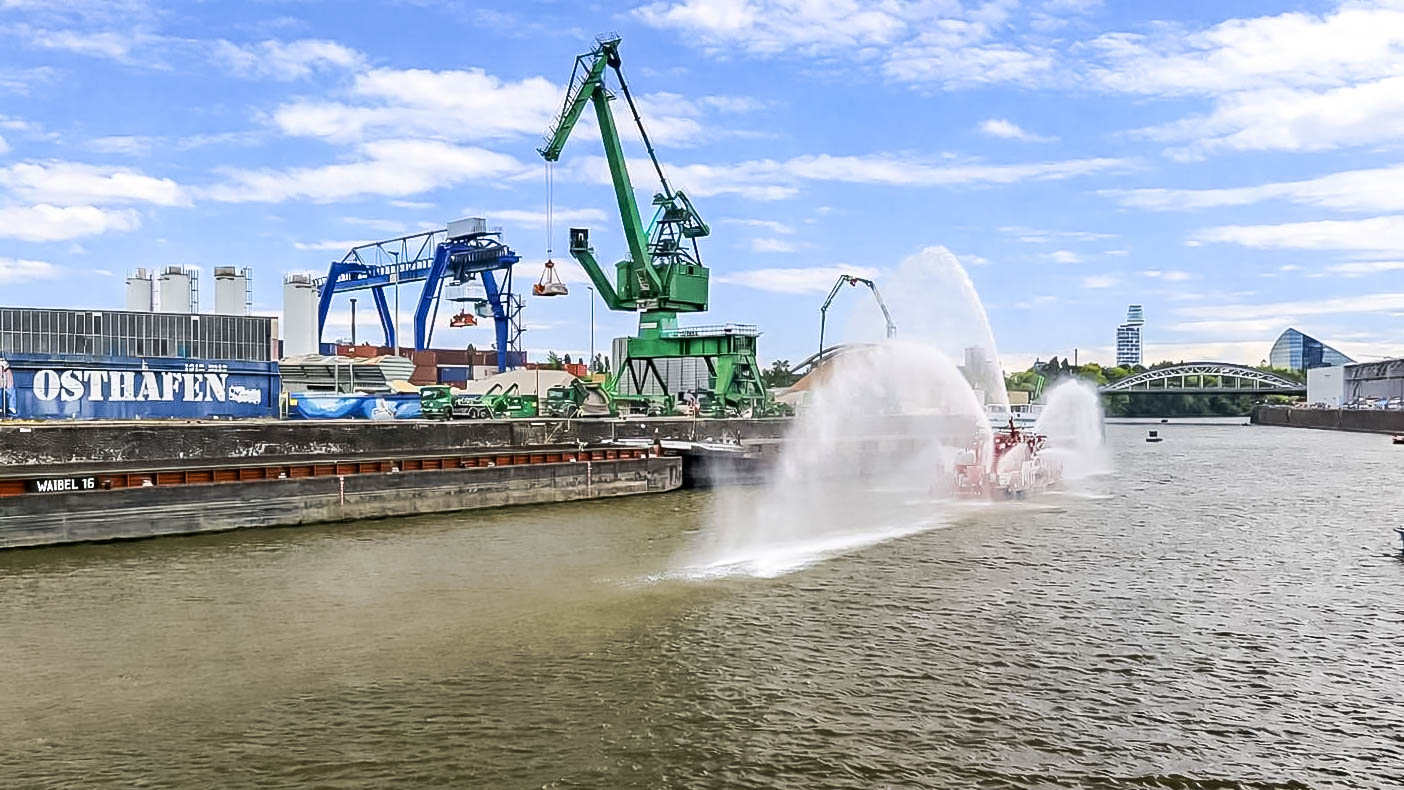
Cranes is East Harbour (Osthafen)

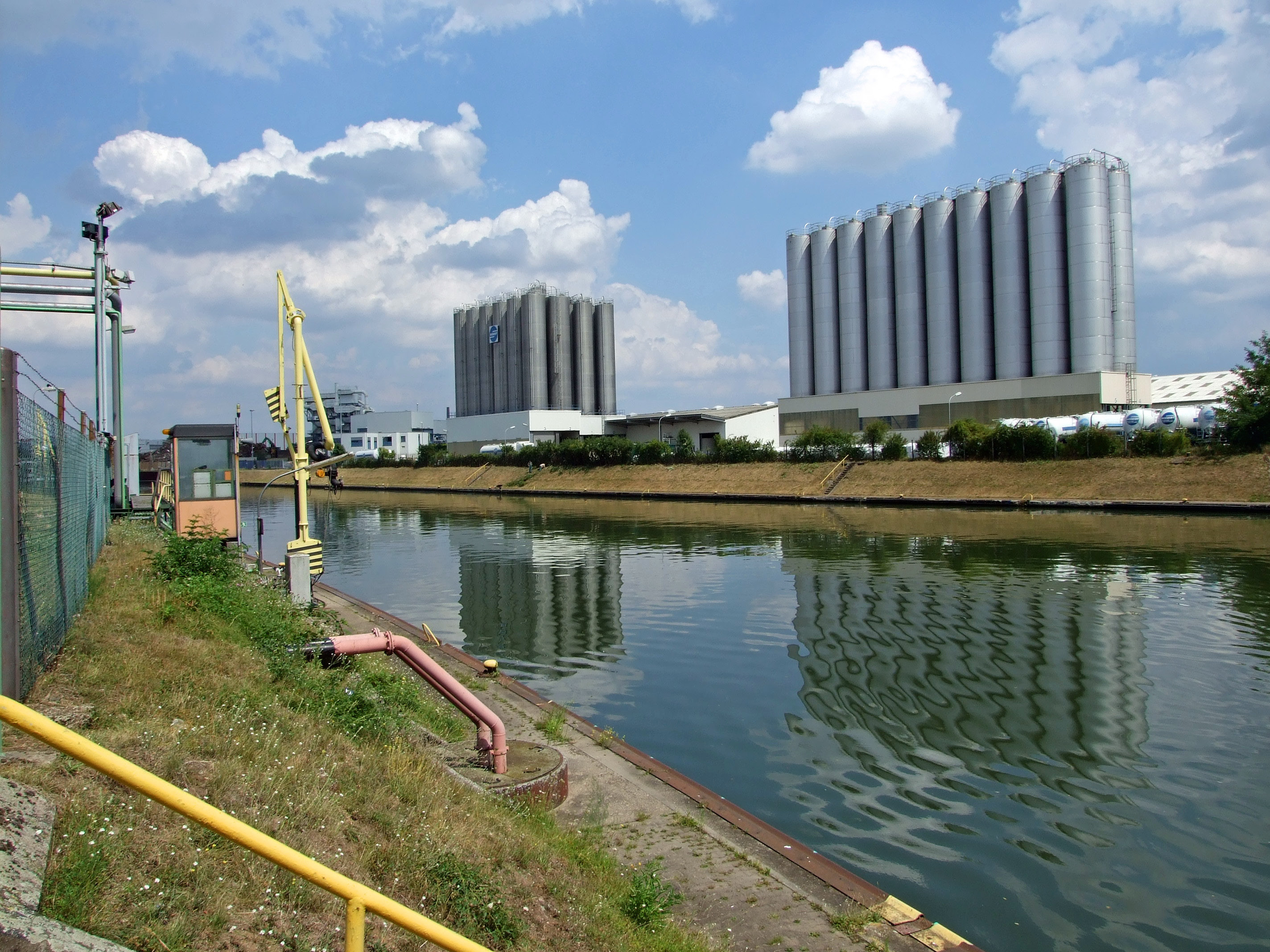
Becken II at Oberhafen

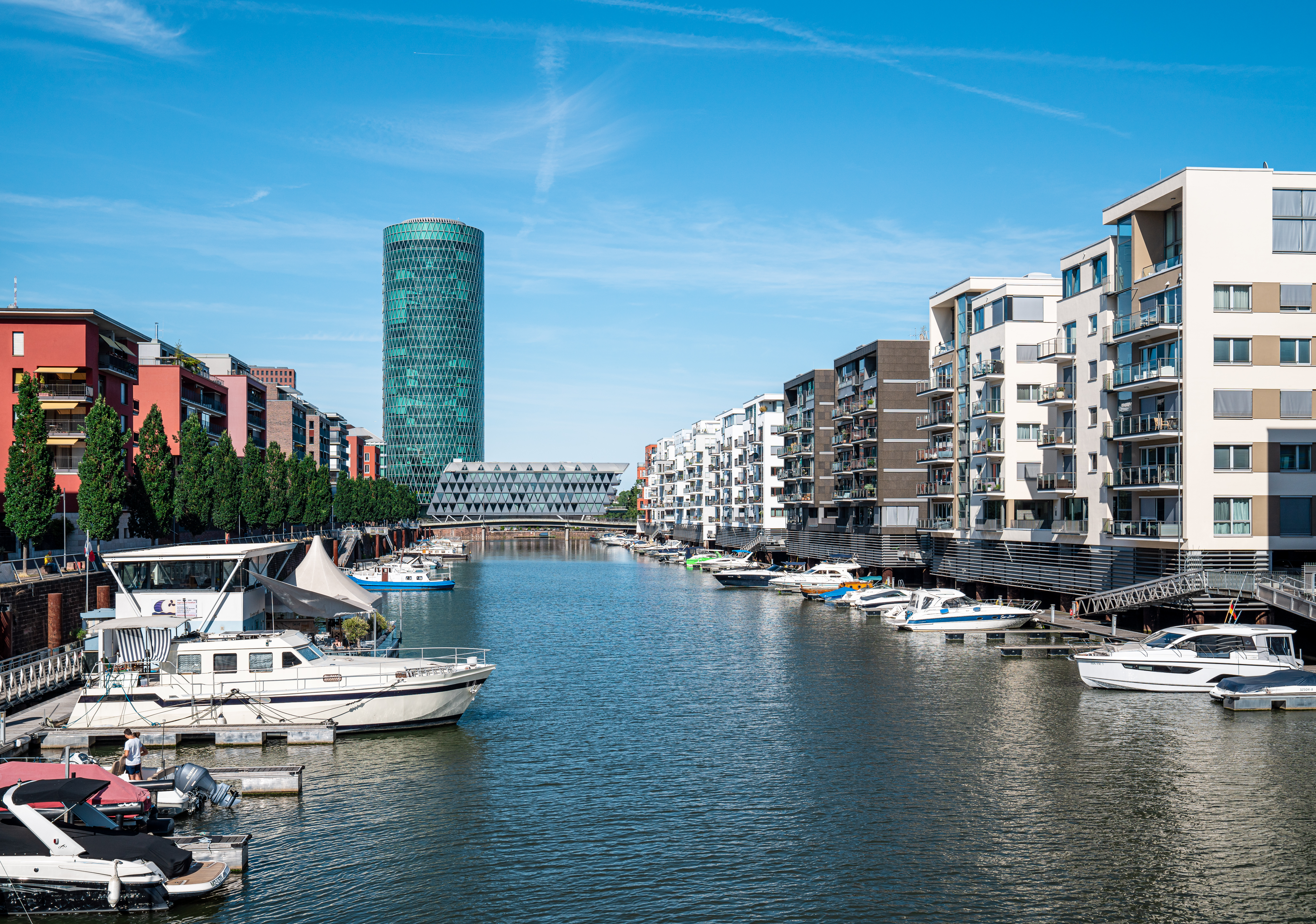
Westhafen port with residential areas to the side and the Westhafen Tower in the distance

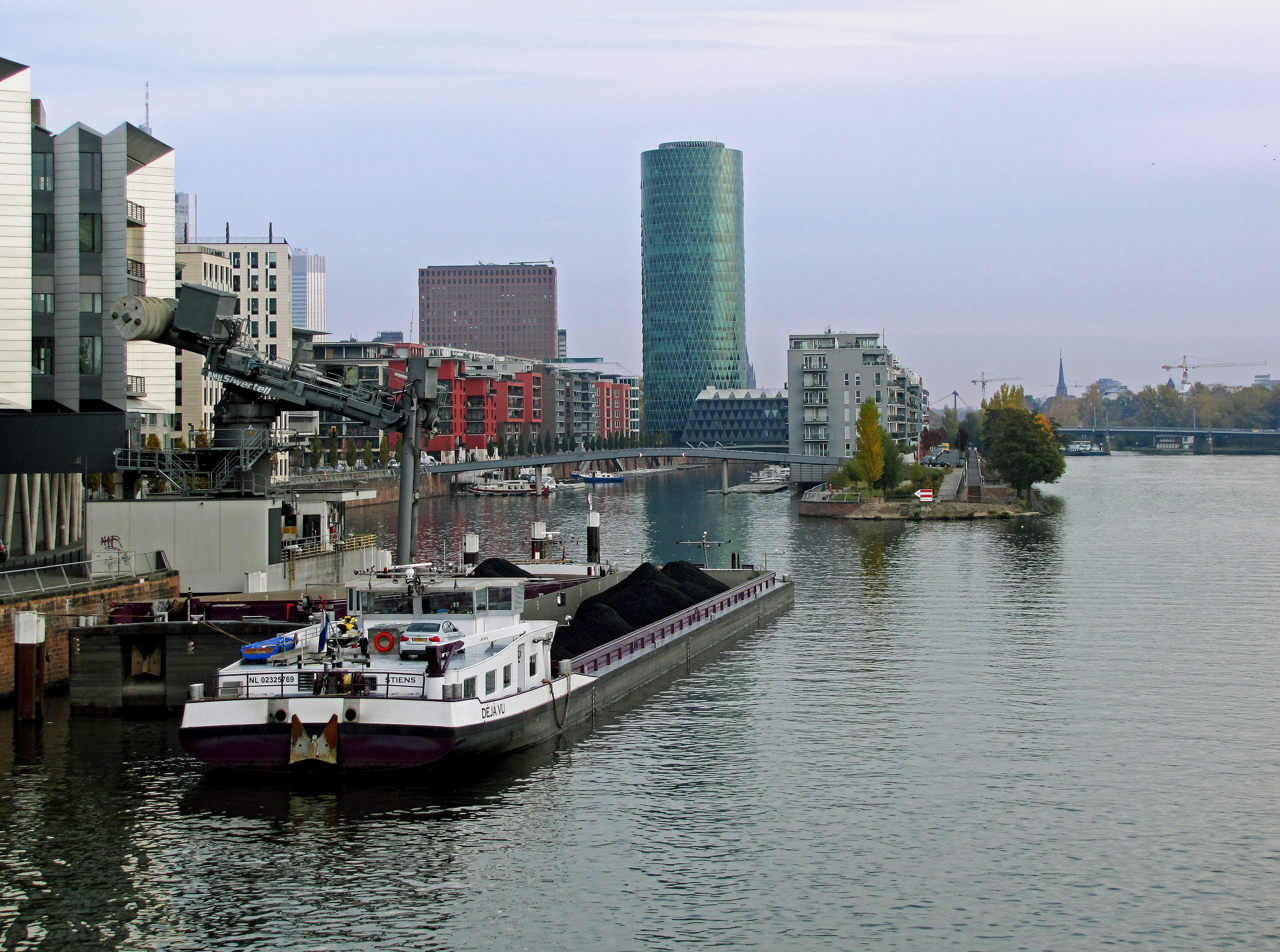
Jetty of the Kraftwerk West

Frankfurt am Main has multiple inland ports which have been converted over time into new residential areas, owing to both their central location and the appeal of the view of the Main (river) from urban living spaces.

In the direction of flow, these ports are:

- Port Mainkur (formerly Port Cassella) in the industrial area of Fechenheim. The port only has a small basin which is occasionally used to provide water to the companies located at the Cassella Industrial Park.
- Osthafen is the biggest port in Frankfurt and almost working at full capacity. It consists of the Oberhafen (Upper Harbour) and the Unterhafen (Lower Harbour) which are separated from each other by the Offenbach Barrage. Oberhafen consists of two basins, both of which flow directly into the Main, and is easily accessible from land via the Hafenbahn and the nearby A 661 Autobahn. A third, easterly basin was planned, but it was never built. The Unterhafen has the shape of a tuning fork and has a forebay (reservoir) which branches into two separate basins. A planned extension of the Nordbecken (north basin) was indeed excavated, but it was never connected to the basin. The pit filled up with groundwater and now forms the Schwedlersee. The Honsellbrücke crosses over the forebay and the Schmickbrücke crosses over the Südbecken (southern basin).
- The Mainkai, located by the Altstadt, was the oldest port in the city. Today it serves as a waterfront. The extension of the Mainkai in the West towards the Main-Neckar-Brücke is called the Untermainkai. Until the mid-19th century a narrow tributary of the Main, called the Kleiner Main (Small Main), flowed underneath the quay's wall. The tributary was home to a small, off-shore island called Mainlust, until the Kleiner Main was filled in during 1859. After the tributary had been filled in, the Nizza, an area of green space, developed. Tracks for the Verbindungsbahn still remain in the area, but now serve more of a tourist purpose for the Historic Railway than to transport goods. Companies such as Antwerpener Werft, Nizzawerft, Leonhardswert, Fahrtowerft, and Weseler Werft all make reference to the older usage of the port area as a shipyard (Werft in German), as well as a historical loading crane located opposite the Städel Museum. By the Eiserner Steg there is still a landing stage for excursion ships; hotel ships also dock downstream to the Holbeinsteg during exhibition seasons.
- The Schaumainkai, located on the Sachsenhausen side of the Main, has become synonymous with the Museumsufer — a series of museums all located along the Main. Whilst the museums reside by the high banks of the river, the Tiefkai, the lower part of the port, is a green area and one of the most attractive parts of the city. There also exist references here to the previous usage of the port as a shipyard, such as Schifferwerft, Dreikönigswerft, Deutschherrnwerft, and Schlachthofwerft.
- The Westhafen in the Gutleutviertel district was converted into an inner-city living quarter. The basin, now connected by two bridges, still remains accessible and serves as a yacht harbor. The neighbouring Heizkraftwerk West still continues to receive black coal by ship via its own landing stage.
- The river port Gutleuthof downstream of the power plant is still in operation and has a rail connection to the port Hafenbahn.
- The loading dock at Griesheim Industrial Park is still used, albeit it only rarely.
- The Höchster Hafen below the Höchster Altstadt was shut down in 1982. A gantry crane from the 1950s (extending to the height of the former power stations), as well as another crane from the 19th century at the mouth of the Niddamm, are reminders of the previous usage as a harbour.
- At the Höchst Industrial Park, there are six dock shelters on the north bank for handling tankers. Between the mittlere Werksbrücke and the Leunabrücke is a quay wall several hundred meters long, where ships can also dock. The quay is mainly used to unload power plant coal for the park's combined heat and power plant. On the south side there is a 450-metre-long basin in which several ships can moor at the same time. It is mainly used for the delivery of rock salt for the Chloralkali process as well as container handling for the Rhine-Main Container Port.

Cargo handling in the Frankfurt ports fluctuates depending on the economic situation, but is slightly declining overall. In 1997, a total of 8,439 ships were handled in all the Frankfurt ports, handling about 4.9 million tonnes of goods. By 2006, the figures had fallen to 5516 ships with approx. 3.5 million tonnes of goods handled. The decline in bulk goods such as coal, gravel and scrap metal plays a major role in this. In contrast, container handling plays has helped increase numbers. In 2015, 4.3 million tonnes of goods and 64,794 containers were handled in all Frankfurt ports.

in 2008, 1917 ships with 2.38 million tons, including 42,652 container units, were handled in the city's ports. in 2011, 1745 ships with 2.0 million tons, including 28,495 containers. in 2015, 2113 ships were handled with a total of 2,569,287 tons, including 37,335 containers.

About 1200 ships with about 1.9 million tons, including 32,000 containers, are handled in Höchst Industrial Park alone.
