= Port of Algeciras =

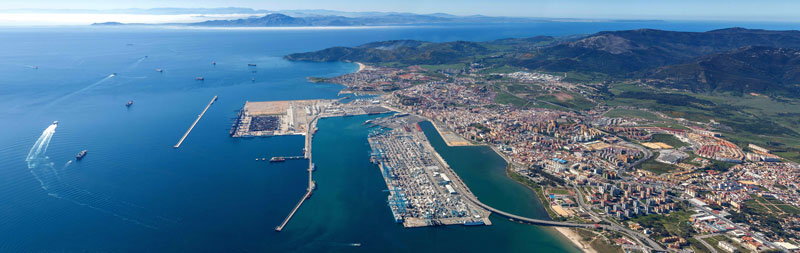
- Port of Algeciras
- Interactive map of Port of Algeciras
- Location in Spain

Location
- Country: Spain
- Location: Strait of Gibraltar
- Coordinates: 36.136°N 5.435°W
- UN/LOCODE: ESALG

Statistics
- Annual cargo tonnage: 107.30 million (▼1.70%) (2020)
- Annual container volume: 5.1 million TEUs (▼0.40%) (2020)

The Port of Algeciras is the port and harbour of Algeciras, a city located in the province of Cádiz in the autonomous community of Andalusia, Spain. It is a commercial, fishing and passenger port. Primarily a transshipment port, its position near the Strait of Gibraltar and key east–west shipping routes establishes it as one of the busiest transshipment hubs in the world. It competes with Tanger-Med for the local transshipment market. It consists of numerous maritime infrastructures scattered throughout the Bay of Gibraltar. Although only the town of Algeciras and La Línea de la Concepción overlook the bay, there are port facilities in the rest of the bank, also belonging to the municipalities of San Roque and Los Barrios. It is managed along the port of Tarifa by the Port Authority of Algeciras Bay.

== Rankings ==
It is the largest port in Spain with almost 100 million tons in 2015 and second largest in the Mediterranean Sea, and in 2018 was the 31st in the world in container shipping, and 33rd overall in 2019. In 2010 it exceeded 70 million tons in total traffic and more than 2.8 million containers. The port totals over 10 km of quays in different basins, which manage all types of passenger and freight traffic.

It is the 7th busiest container port in the continent of Europe and 28th in the world with a trade volume of 2.81 million TEUs in 2010 (World Shipping Council) and 9th busiest port by cargo in Europe and 57th in the world with a cargo volume of 69,572,000 tons in 2008.

== Operations ==
In addition to containers, port operations include bunker fuel handling, cruise shipping, roll-on/roll-off and facilities for a fishing fleet.

== Fauna ==
Despite the heavy ship track, whales and dolphins are known to swim into the port from time to time (see Bay of Gibraltar.)

== History ==
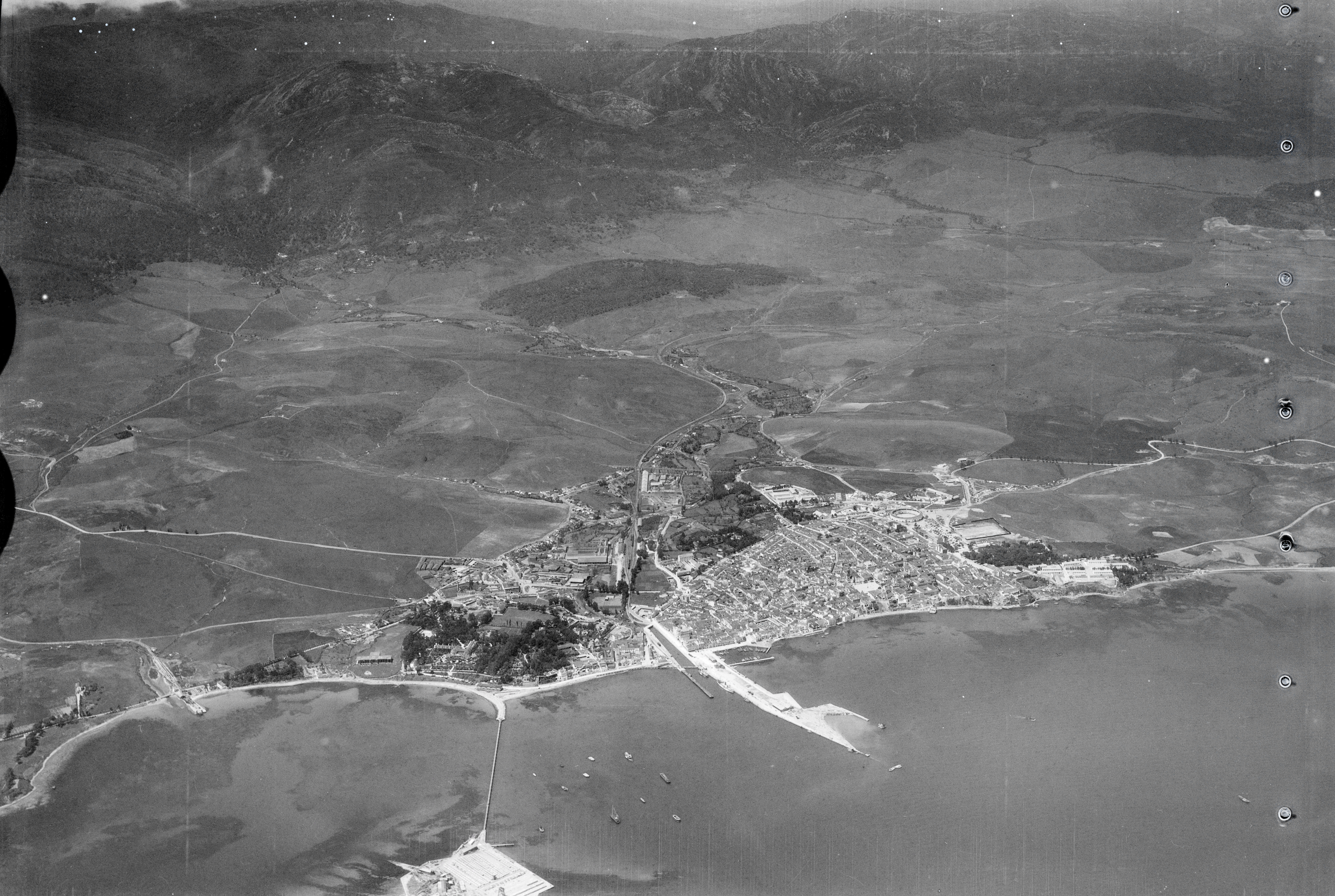
Algeciras in 1928

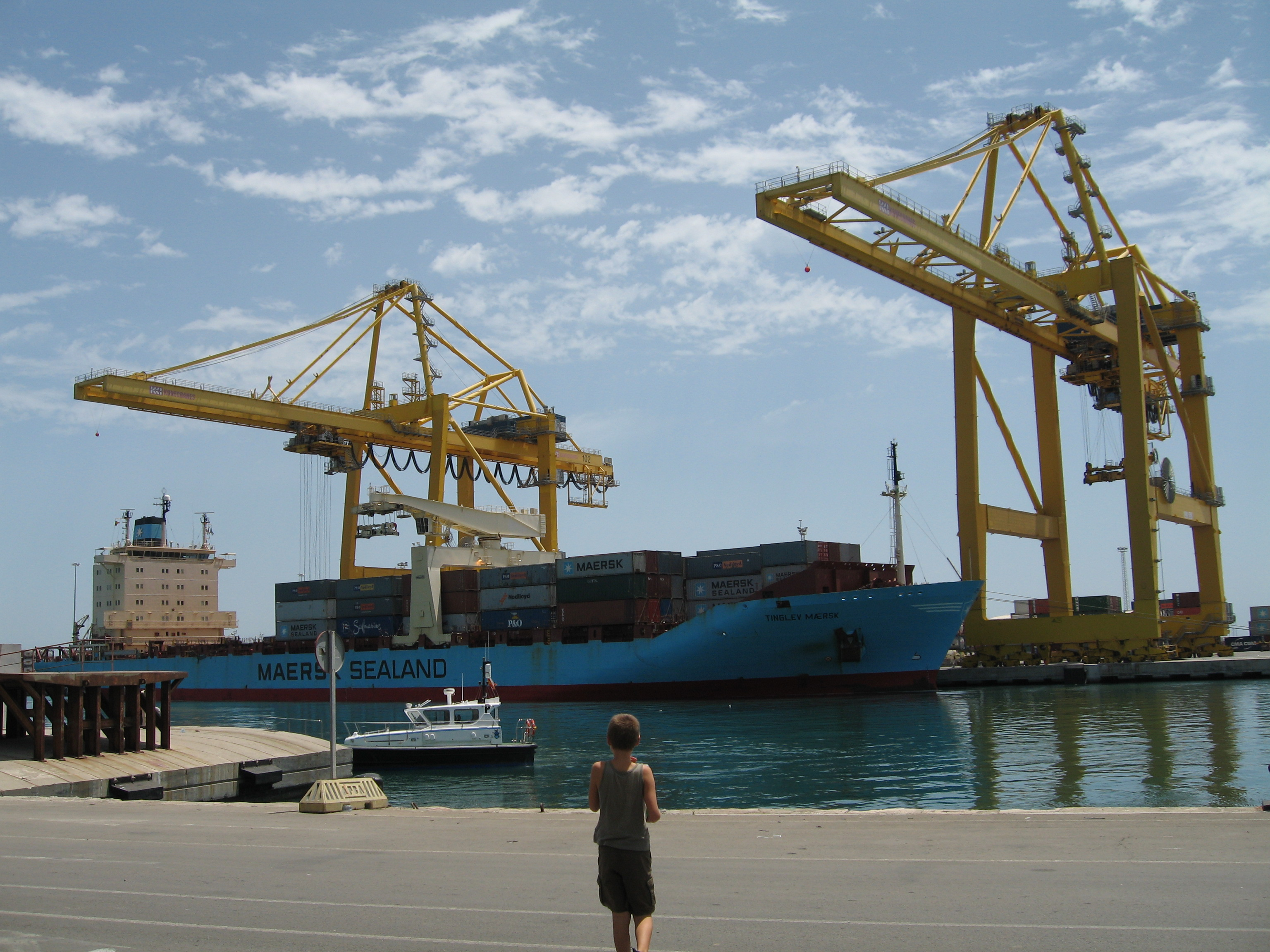
Large freighters in the port of Algeciras

Unlike other major European ports, the present port is rather young. In ancient times the maritime shipping focused on Carteia, which was abandoned in the Middle Ages. During the Muslim presence in the Iberian Peninsula, Algeciras became the crossing point for crossing the Strait of Gibraltar. In the wake of the 1369 Nasrid takeover of Algeciras away from the Crown of Castile, Nasrids carried out a scorched-earth policy and destroyed Algeciras, with the Nasrid garrison thereby relocating to Gibraltar, a worse port but more easily defendable.

With the conquest of Gibraltar in 1704, the population fled and was distributed mainly along the bay. Several settlements were established, of which the only one on the banks of the sea was the repopulation of Algeciras. In the new distribution of the bay a port facility was not created until 1894, when a wooden jetty was created at the mouth of the Río de la Miel.

== Destinations ==
- Ceuta by Balearia, FRS and Trasmediterranea
- Tangier by Balearia, FRS, Inter Shipping and Trasmediterranea

== See also ==
- List of ports in Spain
- List of busiest ports in Europe
- List of busiest container ports

== Bibliography ==
- Alfonso, Carolin (2008). ""Gateway" City and Nexus Between Two Continents: The Port City of Algeciras". In Kokot, Waltraut; Gandelsman-Trier, Mijal; Wildner, Kathrin; Wonneberger, Astrid (eds.). Port Cities as Areas of Transition. Ethnographic Perspectives (PDF). Bielefeld: transcript-Verlag. pp. 111–124. ISBN 978-3-89942-949-7.
