= Pedassaar =

Island in Estonia

Coordinates: 59°31′N 25°23′E

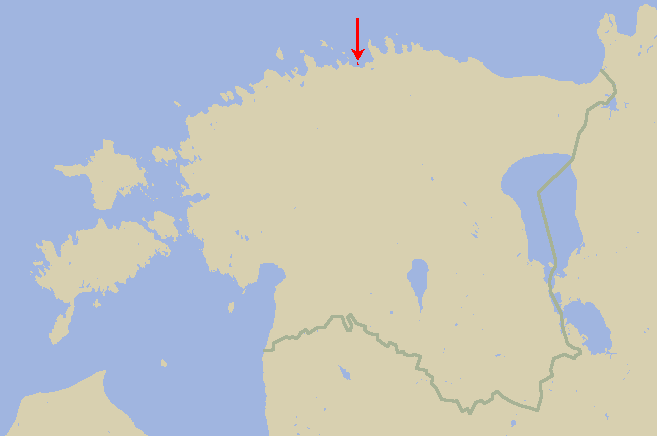
Location of Pedassaar in Estonia.

Pedassaar is an island in the Gulf of Finland belonging to Estonia.

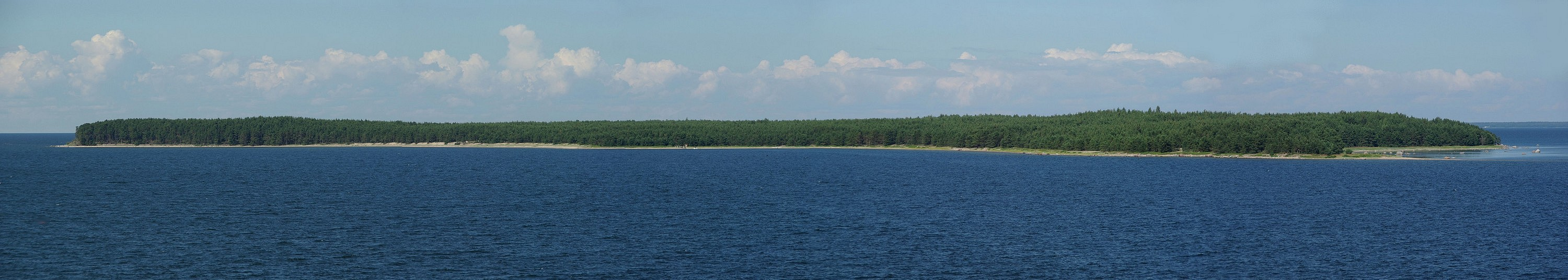

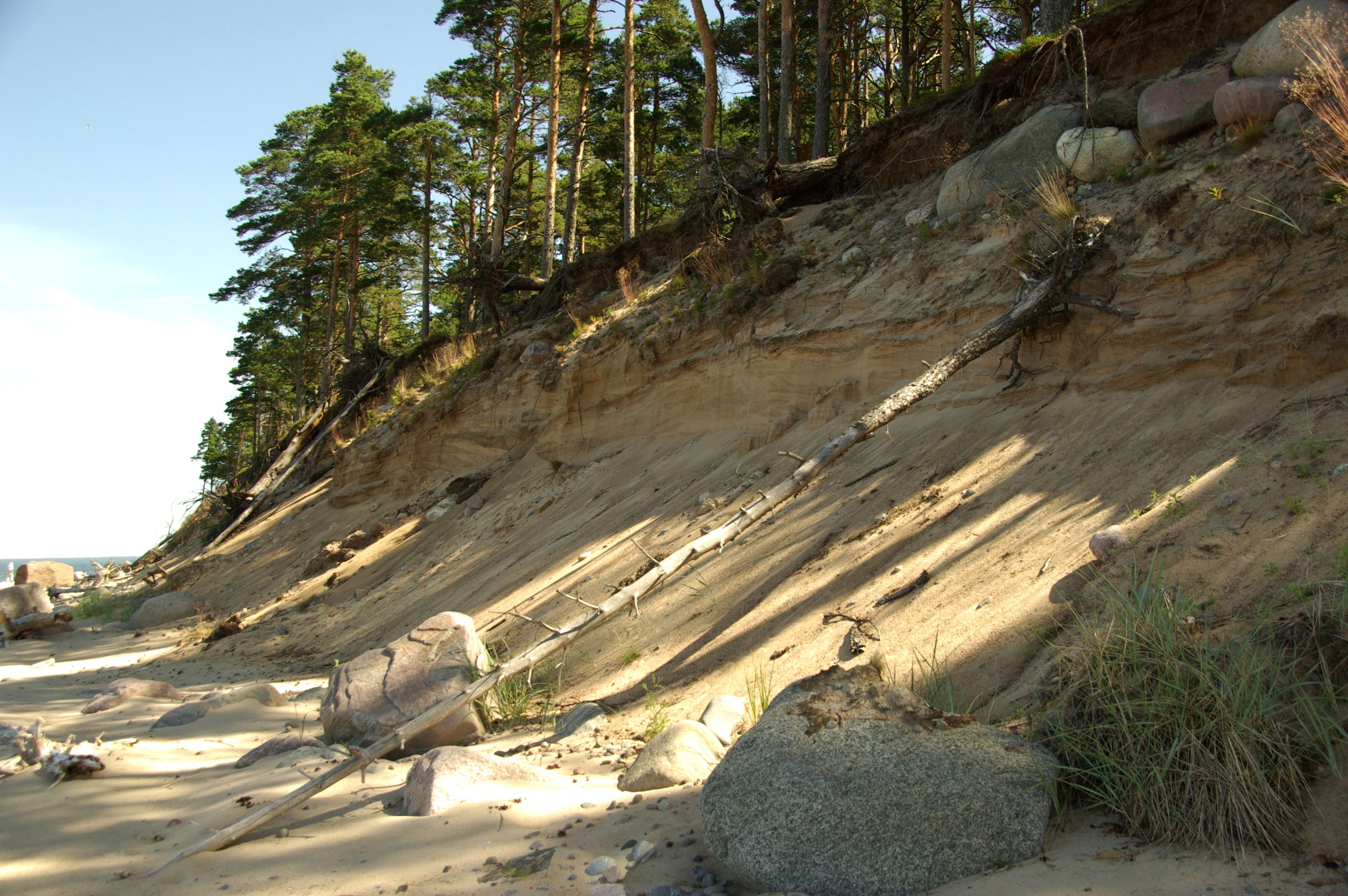

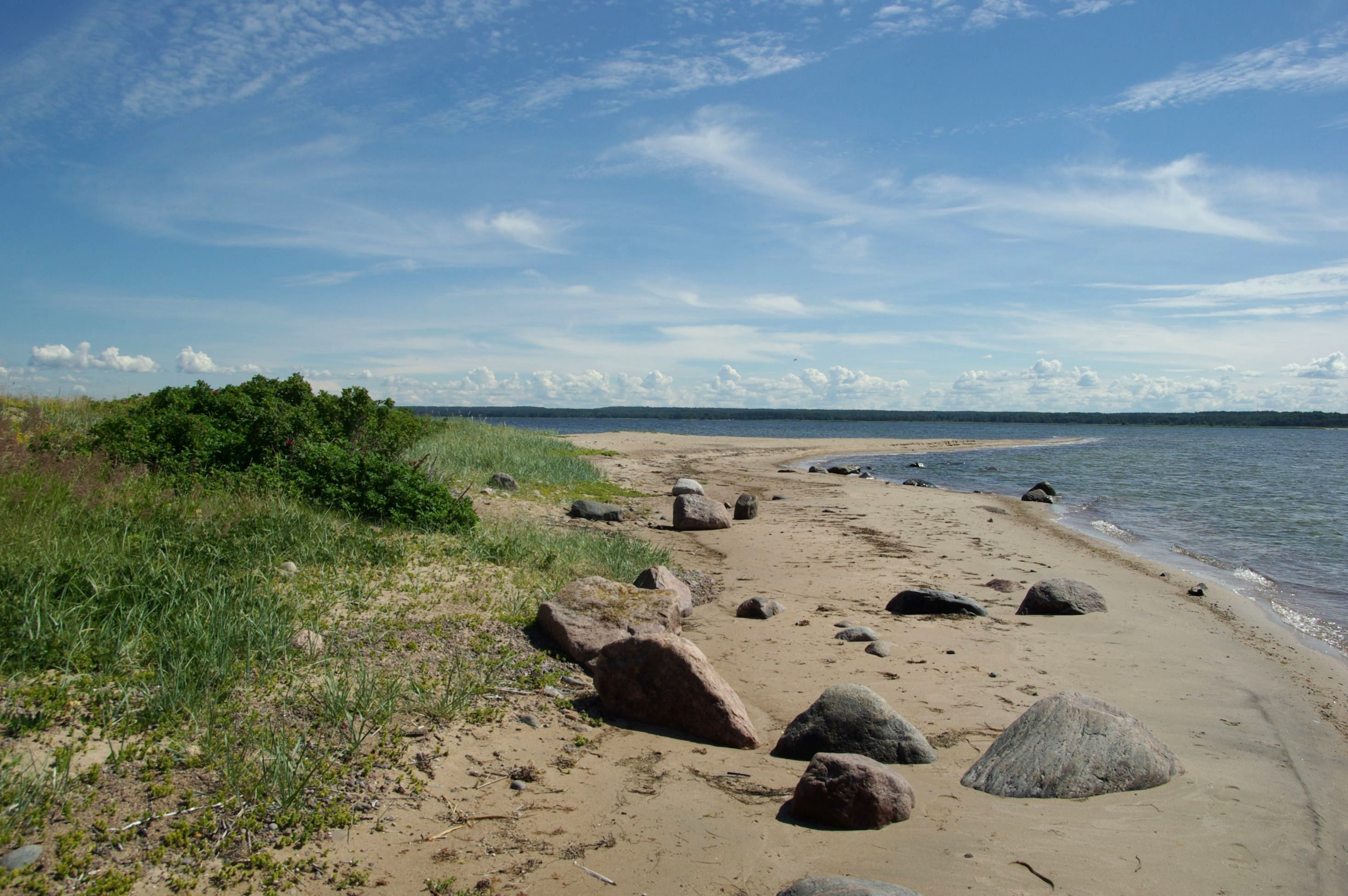

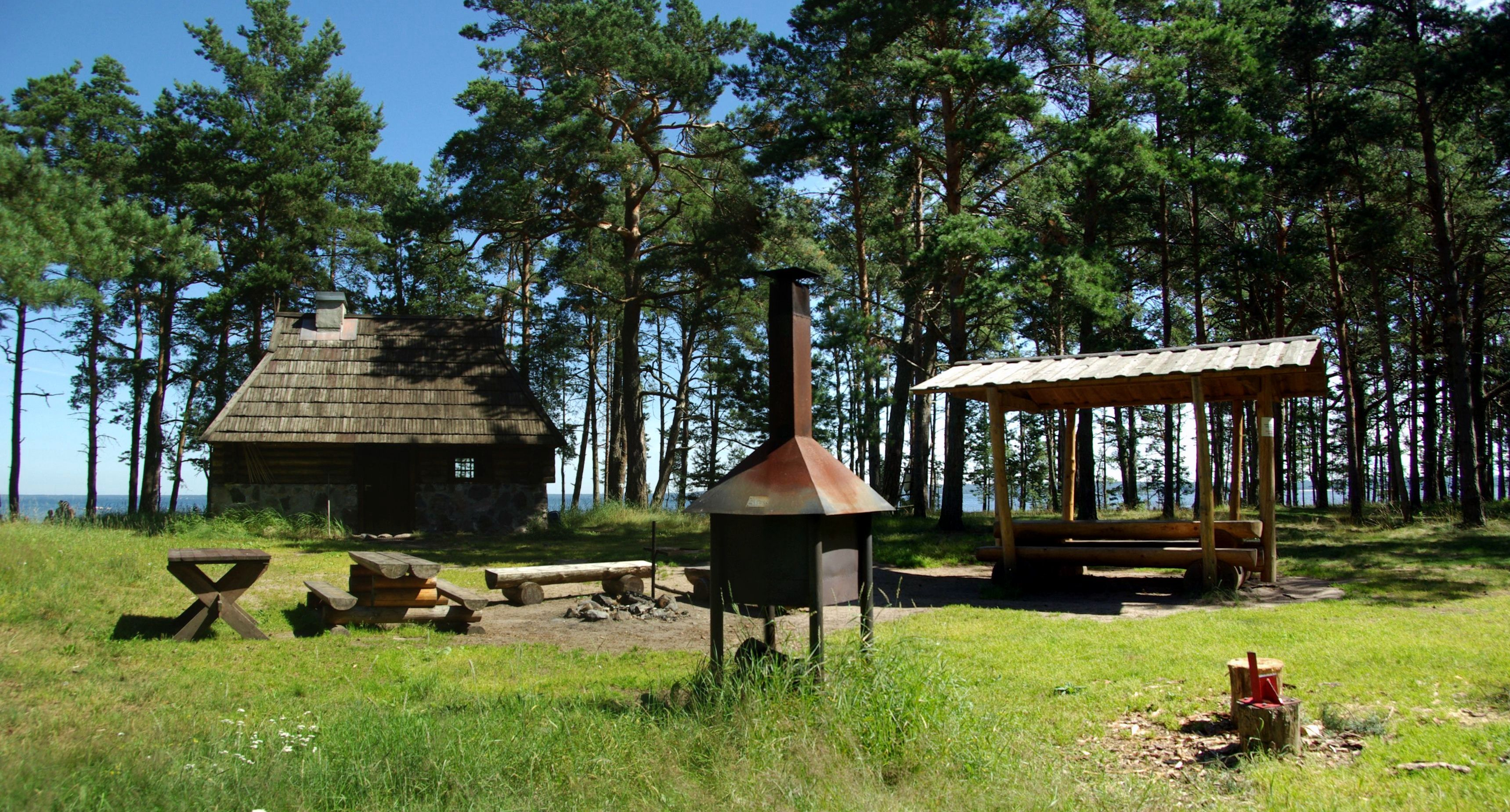

== See also ==
- Aksi
- Koipsi
- Malusi Islands
- Prangli
- Rammu
- Rohusi
