= Kolga Bay =

Bay in Estonia

Coordinates: 59°33′N 25°26′E

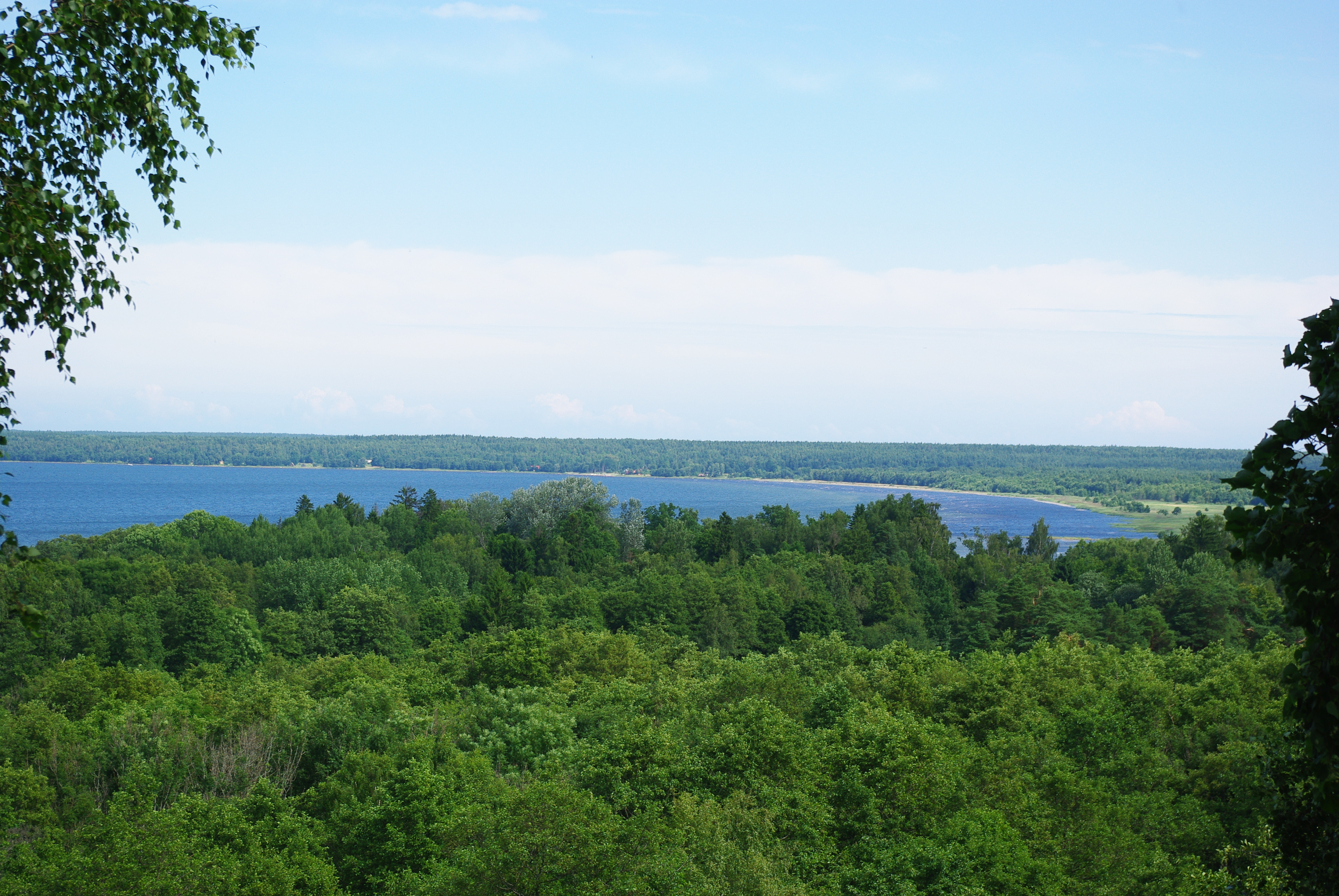
View to Kolga Bay

Kolga Bay (Estonian: Kolga laht) is a bay in Harju County, Estonia.

The southern part of the bay consists of Haapse and Salmistu Bay. Several islets are found in the bay, including Pedassaar and Rohusi.

Part of the bay protection as the Kolga Bay Landscape Conservation Area.
