= Kiperort Peninsula =

Peninsula in Leningrad Oblast, Russia

Coordinates: 60°29′N 28°31′E

Kiperort (Russian: Киперо́рт) is a peninsula located at the northern coast of the Gulf of Finland in Vyborgsky District of Leningrad Oblast, Russia, near the town of Primorsk, Leningrad Oblast.

== See also ==
- Beryozovye Islands
