= Gulf of Finland =

Arm of the Baltic Sea

- Interactive map of Gulf of Finland
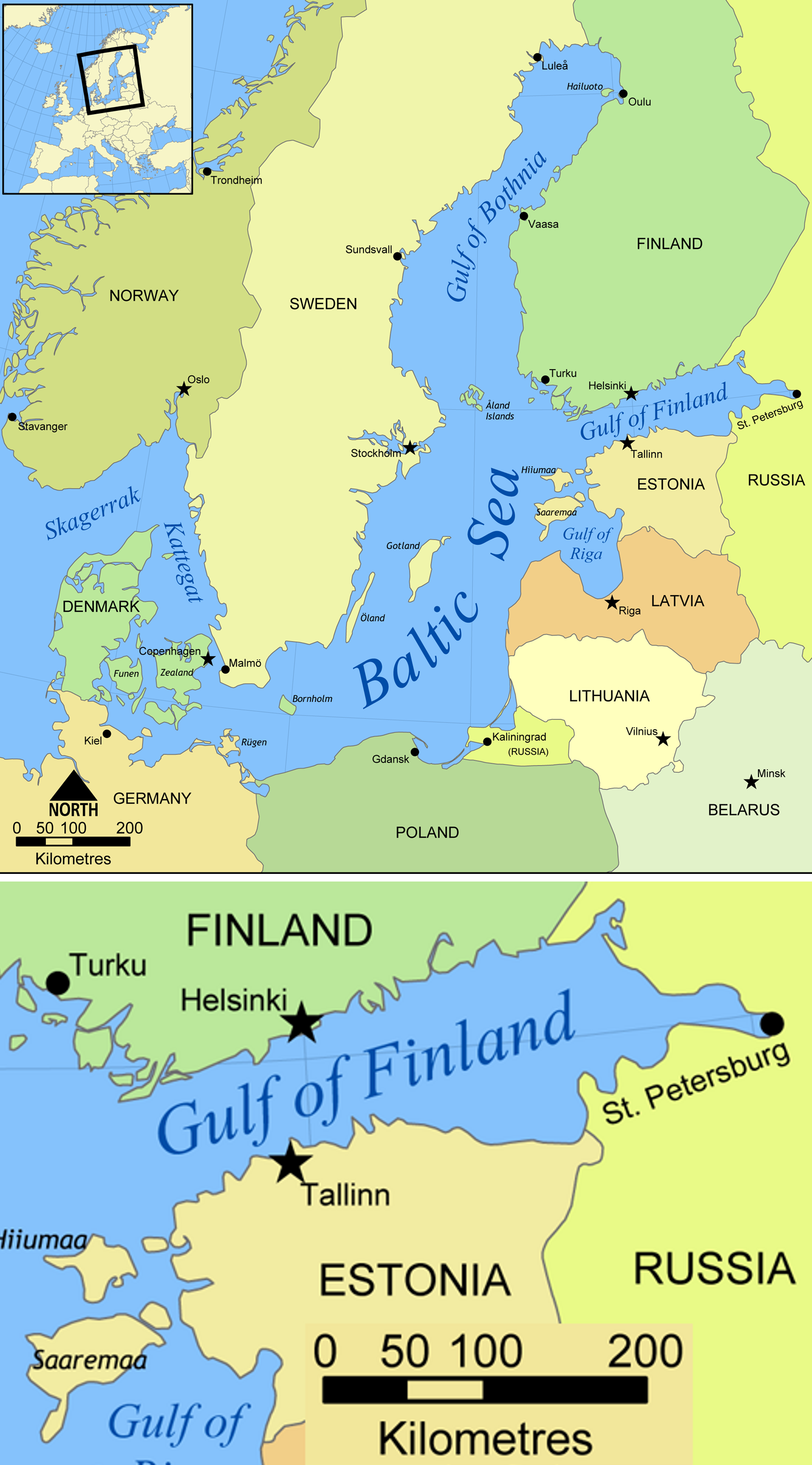
- Coordinates: 59°50′N 26°00′E
- Basin countries: Estonia; Finland; Russia
- Max. length: 400 km (250 mi)
- Max. width: 130 km (81 mi)
- Surface area: 30,000 km^{2} (12,000 sq mi)
- Average depth: 38 m (125 ft)
- Max. depth: 115 m (377 ft)
- Settlements: Saint Petersburg, Helsinki, Tallinn

Ramsar Wetland
- Official name: Southern coast of the Gulf of Finland, Baltic Sea
- Designated: 13 September 1994
- Reference no.: 689

The Gulf of Finland (Estonian: Soome laht; Finnish: Suomenlahti; Russian: Фи́нский зали́в, romanized: Finskiy zaliv; Swedish: Finska viken) is the easternmost arm of the Baltic Sea. It extends between Finland to the north and Estonia to the south, to Saint Petersburg—the second largest city of Russia—to the east, where the river Neva drains into it. Other major cities around the gulf include Helsinki and Tallinn. The eastern parts of the gulf belong to Russia, and some of Russia's most important oil harbors are located there, including Primorsk. As the seaway to Saint Petersburg, the gulf is of considerable strategic importance to Russia. Some of the environmental problems affecting the Baltic Sea are at their most pronounced in the shallow gulf. Proposals for an undersea Helsinki–Tallinn Tunnel through the gulf have been made.

== Geography ==
Gulf of Finland

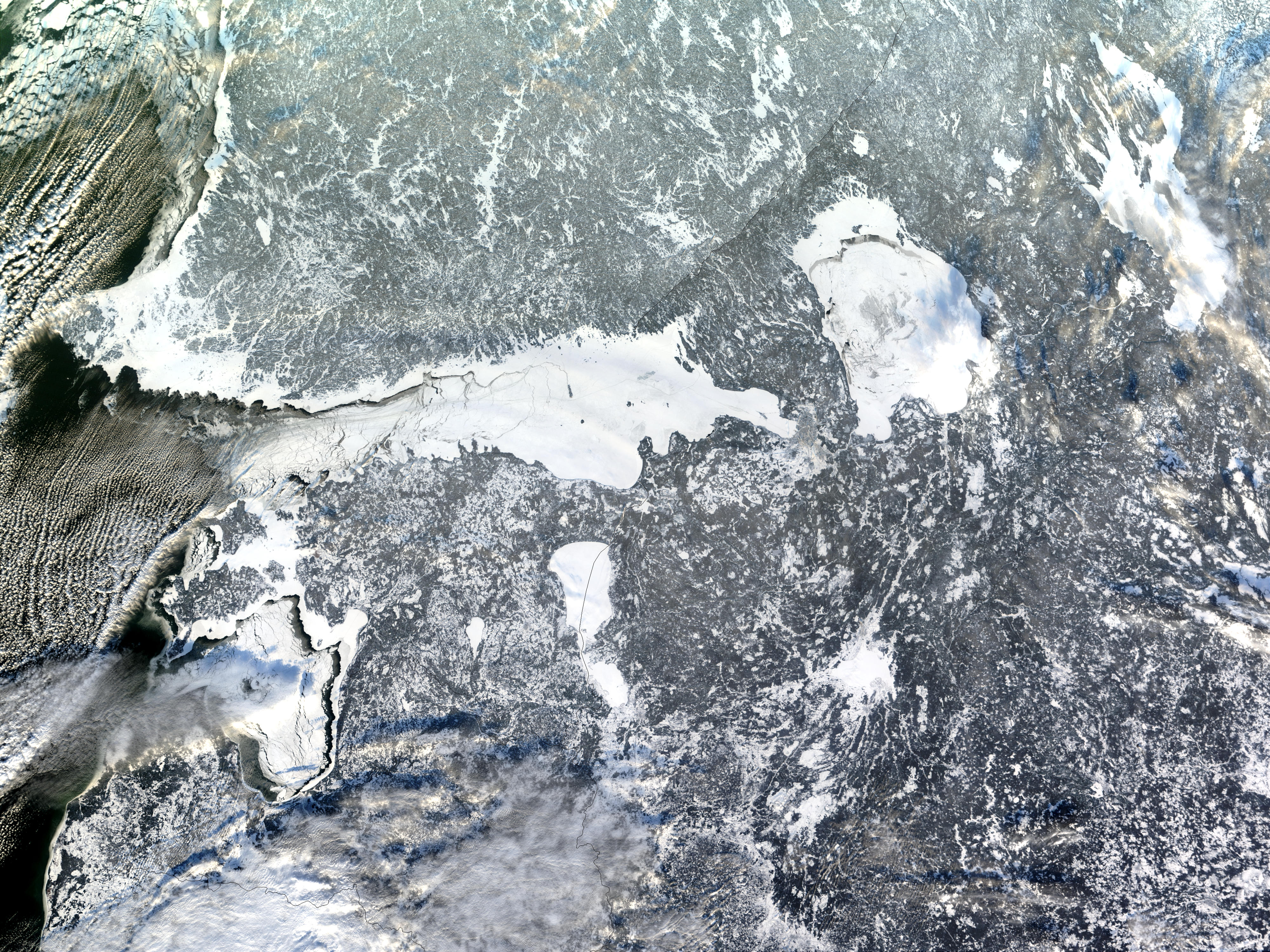
Satellite image showing the gulf entirely frozen over in January 2003

The Gulf of Finland has an area of 30,000 km^{2} (12,000 sq mi). The length (from the Hanko Peninsula to Saint Petersburg) is 400 km (250 mi) and the width varies from 70 km (43 mi) near the entrance to 130 km (81 mi) on the meridian of Moshchny Island; in the Neva Bay, it decreases to 12 km (7.5 mi). The gulf is relatively shallow, with the depth decreasing from the entrance to the gulf to the continent. The sharpest change occurs near Narva-Jõesuu, which is why this place is called the Narva wall. The average depth is 38 m (125 ft) with the maximum of 115 m (377 ft). The depth of the Neva Bay is less than 6 metres (20 ft); therefore, in March 2019, a channel was dug at the bottom for safe navigation. Because of the large influx of fresh water from rivers, especially from the Neva River (two-thirds of the total runoff), the gulf water has very low salinity – between 0.2 and 0.3 ‰ at the surface and 0.3–0.5 ‰ near the bottom. The average water temperature is close to 0 °C (32 °F) in winter; in summer, it is 15–17 °C (59–63 °F) at the surface and 2–3 °C (36–37 °F) at the bottom. Parts of the gulf can freeze from late November to late April; the freezing starts in the east and gradually proceeds to the west. Complete freezing usually occurs by late January, and it may not occur in mild winters. Frequent strong western winds cause waves, surges of water and floods.

The northern coast of the gulf is high and winding, with abundant small bays and skerries, but only a few large bays (Vyborg) and peninsulas (Hanko and Porkkalanniemi). The coast is mostly sloping; there are abundant sandy dunes, with occasional pine trees. The southern shores are smooth and shallow, but along the entire coast runs a limestone escarpment, the Baltic Klint, with a height up to 55 m (180 ft). In the east, the gulf ends with Neva Bay; in the west it merges with the Baltic Sea.

The gulf contains numerous banks, skerries and islands. The largest include Kotlin Island with the city of Kronstadt (population 42,800), Beryozovye Islands, Lisiy Island, Maly Vysotsky Island with the nearby city of Vysotsk (population 1706), Gogland (Suursaari), Moshtchny (Lavansaari), Bolshoy Tyuters (Tytärsaari), Sommers, Naissaar, Kimitoön, Kökar, Seskar (Seiskari), Pakri Islands and others.

Starting in 1700, Russia constructed nineteen artificial islands with fortresses in the gulf. They aimed to defend Russia from maritime attacks, especially in the context of the Great Northern War of 1700–1721. Such fortresses include Fort Alexander, Krasnaya Gorka, Ino, Totleben and Kronshlot.

The largest rivers flowing into the gulf are the Neva (from the east), the Narva (from the south), and the Kymi (from the north). Keila, Pirita, Jägala, Kunda, Luga, Sista and Kovashi flow into the gulf from the south. From the north flow the Sestra River, Porvoo, Vantaa and several other small rivers. The Saimaa Canal connects the gulf with the Saimaa lake.

=== Extent ===
The International Hydrographic Organization defines the western limit of the Gulf of Finland as a line running from Spithami (59°13'N), in Estonia, through the Estonian island of Osmussaar from SE to NW and on to the SW extremity of Hanko Peninsula (22°54'E) in Finland.

== Geological history ==
The modern depression can be traced to the incision of large rivers during the Cenozoic prior to the Quaternary glaciation. These rivers eroded the sedimentary strata above the Fennoscandian Shield. In particular the eroded material was made up of Ediacaran (Vendian) and Cambrian-aged claystone and sandstone. As erosion progressed, the rivers encountered harder layers of Ordovician-aged limestone, leading to the formation of the cliffs of Baltic Klint in northern Estonia and Ingria. Subsequently, the depression was somewhat reshaped by glacier activities. Its retreat formed the Littorina Sea, whose water level was some 7–9 metres higher than the present level of the Baltic Sea. Some 4,000 years ago the sea receded and shoals in the gulf have become its islands. Later uplifting of the Baltic Shield skewed the surface of the gulf; for this reason, its ancient northern shores are significantly higher than the southern ones.

== Flora and fauna ==
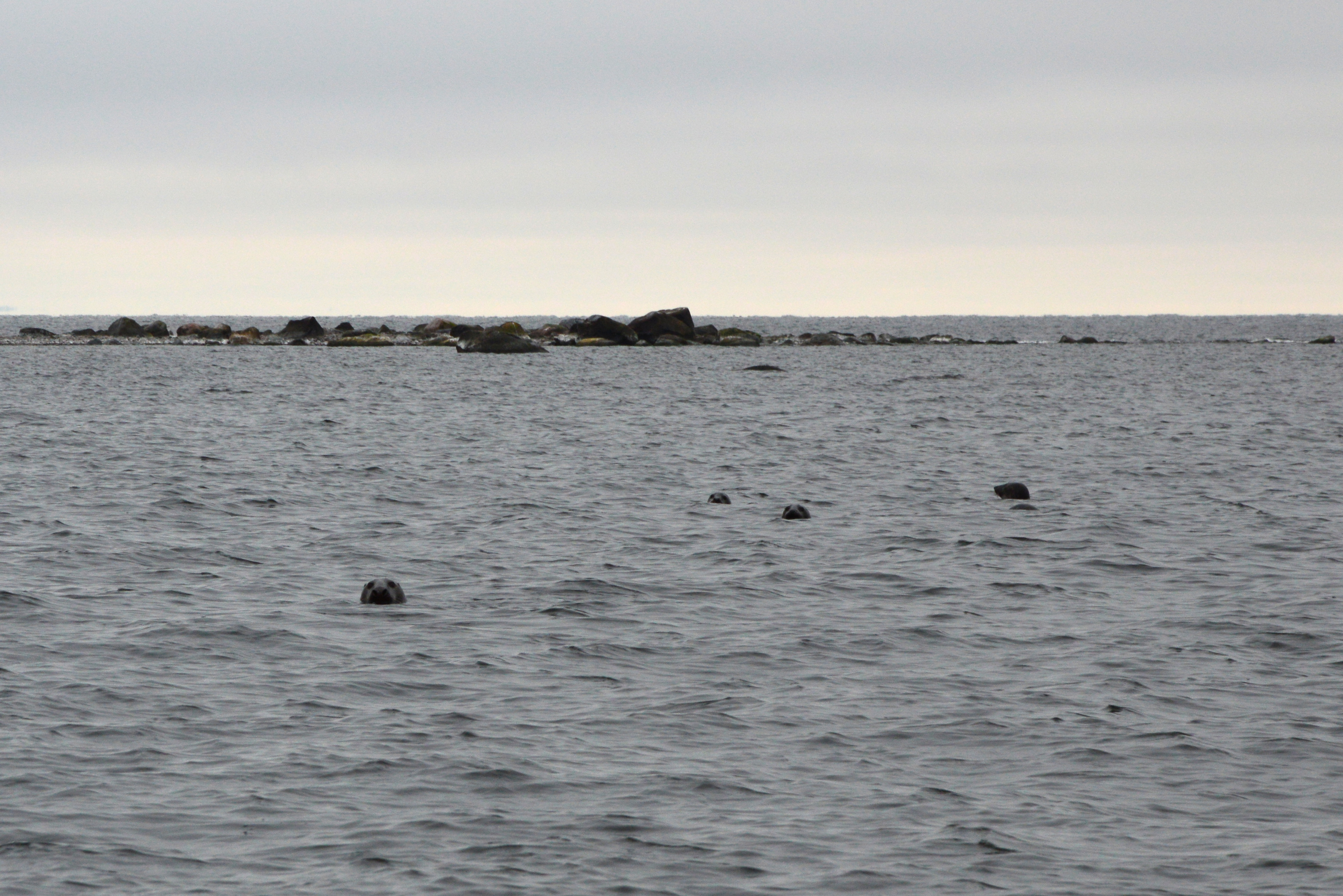
Malusi islands in Estonia are one of the main habitats of grey seals in the Gulf of Finland.

The climate in the area is humid continental climate, characterized by temperate to hot summers and cold, occasionally severe winters with regular precipitation. The vegetation is dominated by a mixture of coniferous and deciduous forests and treeless coastal meadows and cliffs. The major forest trees are pine, spruce, birch, willows, rowan, aspen, common and gray alder. In the far eastern part of the gulf vegetation of the marshy areas consists mainly of bulrush and reeds, as well as fully aquatic plants, such as white and yellow waterlilies and acute sedge. Aquatic plants in the shallow waters of the gulf include Ruppia and spiny naiad.

Fish species of the gulf include Atlantic salmon, viviparous eelpout, gobies, belica, loach, European chub, common minnow, silver bream, common dace, ruffe, Crucian carp, stickleback, European smelt, common rudd, brown trout, tench, pipefish, burbot, perch, gudgeon, lumpsucker, roach, lamprey, vendace, garfish, common whitefish, common bream, zander, orfe, northern pike, spined loach, sprat, Baltic herring, sabre carp, common bleak, European eel and Atlantic cod. Commercial fishing is carried out in spring and autumn. Grey seal and ringed seal are met in the gulf, but the latter is very rare.

== History ==
Many ancient sites were discovered on the shores of the gulf dated to up to 9000 years old. Humans began to inhabit these places soon after the ice age glaciers retreated and the water level of the Littorina Sea lowered to reveal the land. Remains of about 11 Neolithic settlements were found since 1905 in the mouth of the river Sestra River (Leningrad Oblast). They contain arrow tips and scrapers made of quartz, numerous food utensils and traces of fire camps – all indicative of hunting rather than agricultural or animal husbandry activities.

The gulf coast was later populated by Finnic peoples. Estonians inhabited the region of the modern Estonia, Votes were living on the south of the gulf and Izhorians to the south of Neva River. Korela tribes settled to the west of Lake Ladoga. They were engaged in slash-and-burn agriculture, animal husbandry, hunting and fishing. From the 8th to the 13th century, the Gulf of Finland and Neva were parts of the waterway from Scandinavia to the Byzantine Empire.

From the 9th century, the eastern coast of the gulf was controlled by Veliky Novgorod and was called Vodskaya Pyatina. As a result of the 1219, crusade and the Battle of Lindanise, northern Estonia became part of Denmark (Danish Estonia). In the 13th century, the city of Reval (Tallinn) (Latin: Revalia) was established on the site of modern Tallinn, capital of Estonia. As a result of the Estonian uprising in 1343, northern Estonia was taken over by the Teutonic Order and sold by Denmark in 1346. In 1559, during the Livonian War, the Bishop of Ösel-Wiek in Old Livonia sold his lands to King Frederick II of Denmark. The Danish king gave the territory to his younger brother Magnus who landed on Saaremaa with an army in 1560. The whole of Saaremaa became a Danish possession in 1573, and remained so until it was transferred to Sweden in 1645.

In the 12th and 13th centuries, the Finnish tribes on the north of the gulf were conquered by the Swedes who then proceeded to the Slavs. The first encounter is attributed to 1142 when 60 Swedish ships attacked 3 Russian merchant vessels. After a Swedish attack in 1256, the Russian army of Alexander Nevsky crossed the frozen gulf and raided the Swedish territories in the modern Finland. In 1293, the Vyborg Castle and city of Vyborg was founded by the Swedish marshal Torkel Knutsson. The castle was fought over for decades between Sweden and the Novgorod Republic. By the Treaty of Nöteborg in 1323, Vyborg was finally recognized as a part of Sweden. It withstood a prolonged siege by Daniil Shchenya during the Russo-Swedish War of 1496–1499. The town's trade privileges were chartered by King Eric of Pomerania in 1403. Vyborg remained in Swedish hands until its capture by Peter the Great in the Great Northern War (1710).

In 1323, the Treaty of Nöteborg set the border between Sweden and Russia along the river Sestra. In the 15th century, the Izhorian lands of the Novgorod Republic were attached to the Grand Duchy of Moscow. In 1550, Gustav I of Sweden founded a city on the site of modern Helsinki. As a result of the Russian defeat in the Ingrian War (1610–1617) and the Treaty of Stolbovo (1617) the lands on the Gulf of Finland and Neva River became part of the Swedish Ingria. Its capital Nyen was located in the delta of Neva River.

Russia reclaimed the eastern part of the gulf as a result of the victory in the Great Northern War (1700–1721). On 16 May 1703, Saint Petersburg was founded in the mouth of Neva River, not far from Nyen, and in 1712 it became the capital city of Russia. To protect the city from the Swedish fleet, the Kronshlot fortress was built on an artificial island near the Kotlin Island in May 1704. By 1705, five more such forts were built nearby composing the city Kronstadt. These fortifications, nicknamed by the contemporaries "the Russian Dardanelles", were designed to control the Gulf waterway.

In 1710, the cities of Peterhof and Oranienbaum were founded on the southern shore of the Gulf of Finland. On 27 July 1714, near the Hanko Peninsula, the Russian Navy won the Battle of Gangut – a decisive victory over the Imperial Swedish Navy. The Russo-Swedish war ended in 1721 by the Treaty of Nystad, by which Russia received all the lands along the Neva and the Gulf of Finland, as well as Estland, Swedish Livonia and western part of the Karelian Isthmus, including Vyborg. However, Finland was returned to Sweden. The war resumed in (1788–1790), and the Battle of Hogland occurred on 6 July 1788 near the island Gogland. Both the battle and the war were relatively minor and indecisive, with the outcome of Russia retaining its territories.

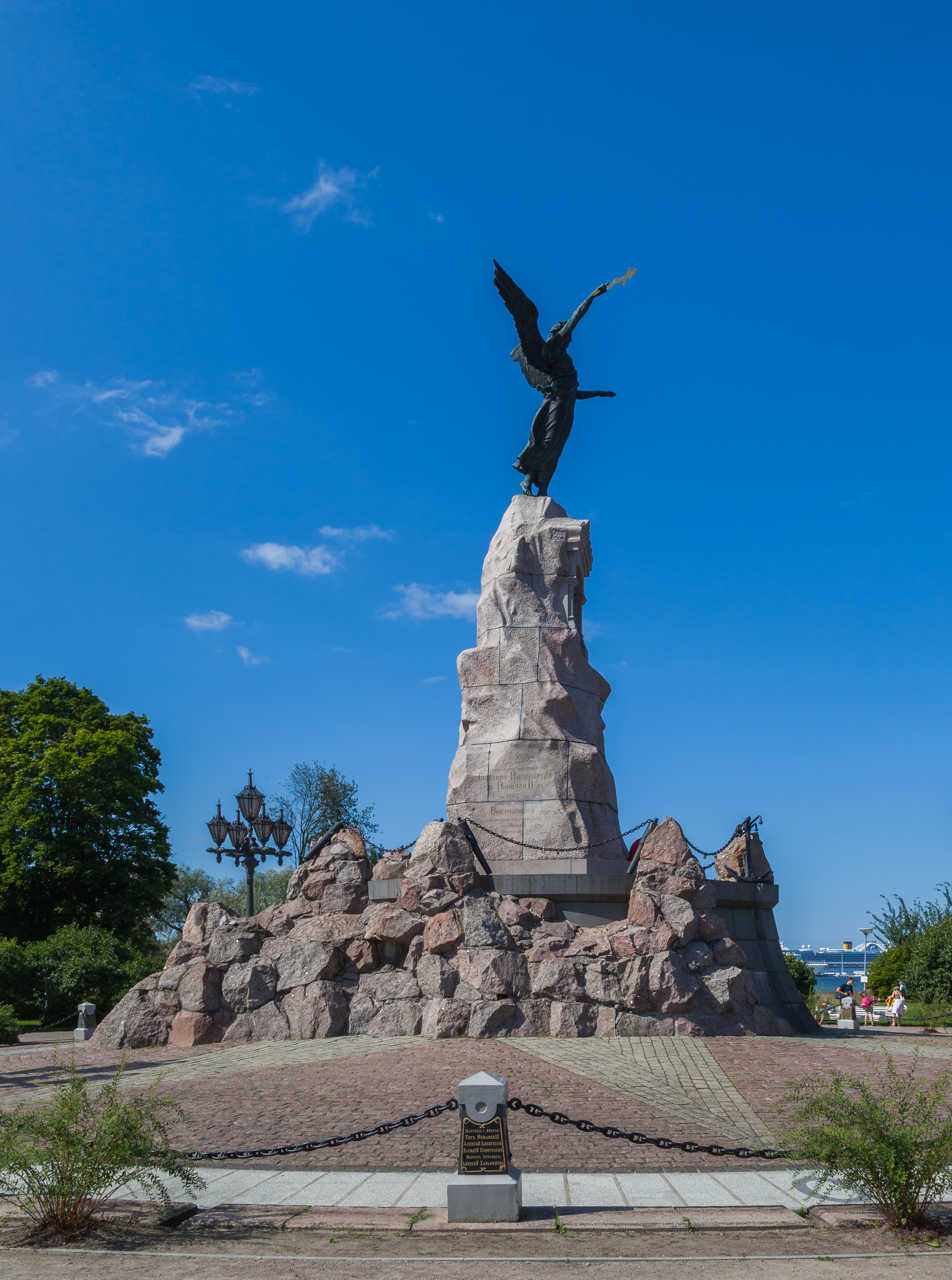
The Russalka Memorial (by Amandus Adamson, 1902) was erected by the Tallinn Bay in memory of a Russian warship which sank in 1893 in a storm in the Gulf of Finland.

The next Russo-Swedish war was fought in (1808–1809). It ended with the Treaty of Fredrikshamn giving the Russia rights on the territory of Finland and Åland. A newly established Grand Duchy of Finland in 1809 received broad autonomy from Russian Empire, and Western Karelia was returned to Finland. On 6 December 1917, the Parliament of Finland promulgated the Finnish Declaration of Independence. Western Karelia was annexed by the Soviet Union after the Winter War.

Estonia declared independence in 1918, and in 1918–1920 fought a successful war of independence against Soviet Russia. Estonia declared neutrality at the outbreak of World War II; however the country was repeatedly contested, invaded and occupied, first by the Soviet Union in 1940, then by Nazi Germany in 1941, and was ultimately reoccupied in 1944 by, and annexed into, the USSR as an administrative subunit (Estonian SSR). Estonia regained independence in 1991.

In March 1921, the Kronstadt rebellion by sailors was put down by the Red Army. The Gulf of Finland had several major naval operations during World War II. In August 1941, during the evacuation of the Baltic Fleet from Tallinn to Kronstadt, German forces sank 15 Russian military vessels, (5 destroyers, 2 submarines, 3 guard ships, 2 minesweepers, 2 gunboats and 1 Motor Torpedo Boat) as well as 43 transport and support ships. Several ships still remain on the gulf bottom near Cape Juminda, and a monument was raised there in memory of those lost in the events.

In 1978, construction was started on the Saint Petersburg Dam aiming to protect Saint Petersburg from the frequent floods. The work was halted at 60% completion in the late 1980s, due to the financial problems related to the breakup of the Soviet Union; it was resumed in 2001 and is – as of August 2011 – complete.

== Economy ==
The southern coast of the gulf contains the Leningrad Nuclear Power Plant and a network of ports and unique natural and historical places. Navigation has long been the dominant activity in the gulf. The major port cities and their functions are, in Russia: Saint Petersburg (all kinds of goods), Kronstadt (container shipping), Lomonosov (general cargo, containers, metals), Vyborg (general cargo), Primorsk (oil and petroleum products), Vysotsk (oil and coal), Ust-Luga (oil, coal, timber, containers); in Finland: Helsinki (containers), Kotka (containers, timber, agricultural products; it is the main transhipment cargo port for Russia), Hanko (containers, vehicles), Turku (containers, rail ferry), Kilpilahti/Sköldvik harbour (oil refinery); in Estonia: Tallinn (grains, refrigerators, oil), Paldiski, Sillamäe. Gulf of Finland is also part of the Volga–Baltic Waterway and White Sea–Baltic Canal. Important goods include apatite from the Kola Peninsula, Karelian granite and greenstone, timber from Arkhangelsk Oblast and Vologda, ferrous metals from Cherepovets, coal from Donbas and the Kuznetsk Basin, pyrite from Ural, potassium chloride from Solikamsk, oil from Volga region, and grains from many regions of Russia.

Passenger transport on the gulf includes a number of ferry lines which connect the following ports: Helsinki and Hanko (Finland), Mariehamn (Åland), Stockholm and Kapellskär (Sweden), Tallinn and Paldiski (Estonia), Rostock (Germany), Saint Petersburg and Kaliningrad (Russia), as well as many other cities. The capitals of Estonia and Finland both face the Gulf and with Estonia joining the EU (2004) and the Schengen Area (2007), travel between those culturally and linguistically close capitals increased dramatically. In 2023 over 7 million passengers traveled by ferry between Tallinn and Helsinki. There are proposals for a fixed link (bridge or tunnel) sometimes referred to with the portmanteau Talsinki.

Another major and historical activity in the gulf is fishing, especially on the northern coast near Vyborg, Primorsk and on the southern coast near Ust-Luga. Commercial fish species are herring, sprats, European smelt, whitefishes, carp bream, roaches, perch, European eel, lamprey and others. In 2005, the catchment was 2000 tons by the ships of Saint Petersburg and Leningrad Oblast alone.

In September 2005 the agreement was signed on the construction of the Nord Stream 1 offshore gas pipeline on the Baltic Sea, from Vyborg to the German city of Greifswald. The first line was expected become operational in 2011. Afterwards, the first line of Nord Stream was laid by May 2011 and was inaugurated on 8 November 2011; the second line was inaugurated on 8 October 2012, and was completed in September 2021, but has not entered service yet, as its approval got halted in February 2022.

== Archaeology ==
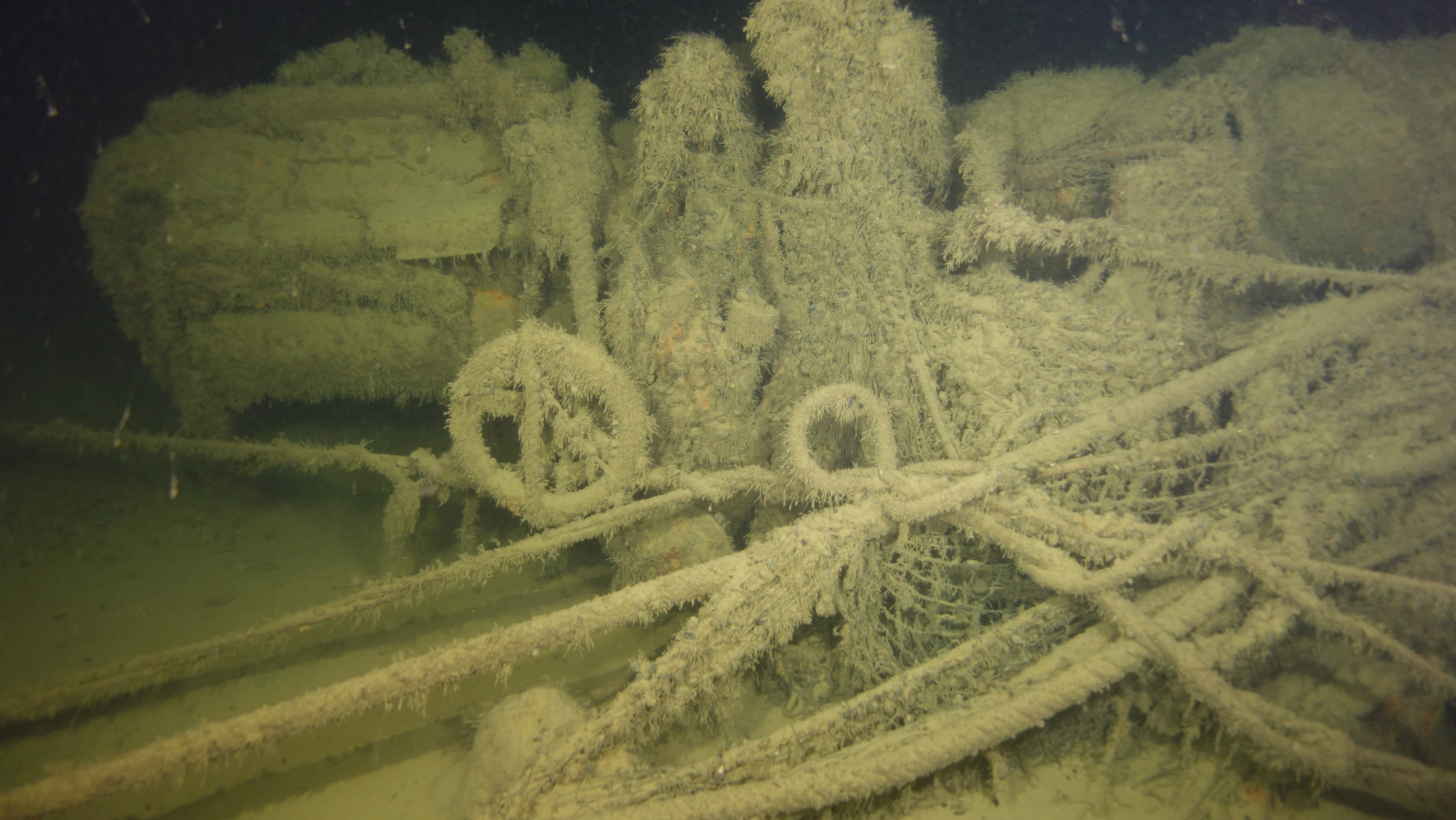
Shipwreck of Kazanets near Osmussaar, in Estonia

The bottom of the gulf is one of the world's largest ship cemeteries. Because of the low salinity and cold waters, and no shipworms, the ships are relatively well preserved. Since the 6th century, major waterways were running through the gulf, and from the 8th to the 10th century, about 3,000 tonnes of silver was transported there. Later, the gulf was actively used by Sweden and Russia for transport of goods. Every year saw dozens of lost ships. In the fall of 1743, 17 Russian warships returning from Finland sank in just 7 hours, and in the summer of 1747, 26 merchant vessels sank within 4 hours near Narva. A record was set in 1721 when during the evacuation of Russian troops from Finland, more than 100 vessels were lost within 3 months, including 64 in a single night.

By the end of 1996, about 5,000 submerged objects were identified in the Russian part of the gulf, including 2,500 ships, 1,500 airplanes, and small items such as boats, anchors, tanks, tractors, cars, cannons, and even naval mines, aerial bombs, torpedoes, and other ammunition. The ships belonged to Russia (25%), Germany (19%), United Kingdom (17%), Sweden (15%), Netherlands (8%), and Finland (7%). The remaining 9% are from Norway, Denmark, France, United States, Italy, Estonia, and Latvia. These objects present potential hazards to navigation, fishery, coastal construction, laying of submarine pipelines and cables, and the environment. Mines were laid in the gulf during World War I (38,932 units), the Russian Civil War, and the Winter War (1939–1940), with an estimated total number of 60,000; 85,000 more mines were set during World War II, and only a fraction of all those were eliminated after the wars.

== Pollution ==
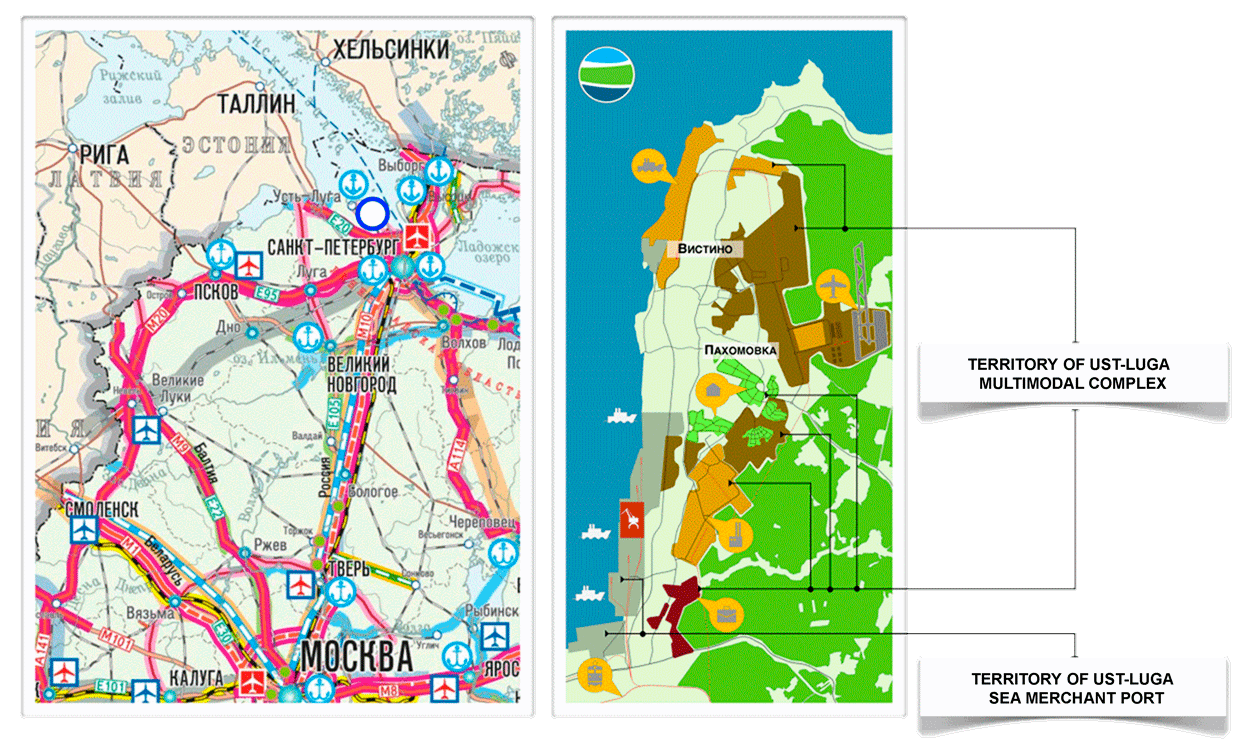
Ust-Luga Multimodal Complex on the Soikinsky Peninsula in the Kingiseppsky District of northwestern Russia

The ecological condition of the Gulf of Finland, Neva Bay and Neva River is unsatisfactory. There is significant contamination by ions of mercury and copper, organochlorine pesticides, phenols, petroleum products and polycyclic aromatic hydrocarbons. Cleaning of waste water in Saint Petersburg was started in 1979 and by 1997 about 74% of wastewater was purified. This number rose to 85% in 2005, to 91.7% by 2008, and as of 2009 was expected to reach 100% by 2011 with the completion of the expansion of the main sewerage plant. Nevertheless, in 2008, the Federal Service of Saint Petersburg announced that no beach of Saint Petersburg is fit for swimming.

Fish catchment decreased 10 times between 1989 and 2005. Apart from pollution, another reason for that is hydraulic and engineering works. For example, construction of new ports in Ust-Luga and Vysotsk and on Vasilyevsky Island adversely affected the spawning of fish. Extraction of sand and gravel in the Neva Bay for the land reclamation destroy spawning sites of European smelt.

Construction of the Saint Petersburg Dam reduced water exchange of the Neva Bay with the eastern part of the gulf by 10–20% that increased the contamination level of Neva Bay. The largest changes occur within 5 km (3 mi) from the dam. Some shallow areas between Saint Petersburg and the dam are turning into swamps. Waterlogging and the associated rotting of plants may eventually lead to eutrophication of the area. Also worrying is expansion of oil ports in the gulf and the construction of a treatment center for spent fuel from the Leningrad Nuclear Power Plant.

The port of Kronstadt is currently serving as a transit point for the import in Russia of radioactive waste through the Baltic Sea. The waste, mostly depleted uranium hexafluoride, is further transported through Saint Petersburg to Novouralsk, Angarsk and other cities of eastern Russia. This transit point will be moved from Saint Petersburg to the port Ust-Luga, which is about 110 kilometres (68 mi) west of Saint Petersburg, and within the Border Security Zone of Russia, as decided by the Russian government in 2003 (Order No. 1491-r of 14 October 2003). It is expected that after this completes it should reduce the ecological risks for Saint Petersburg. Ust-Luga is envisioned to be the largest transportation and logistics hub in northwestern Russia. However, in 2015 it was reported that some construction plans in Ust-Luga were frozen, and the construction of Ust-Luga Multimodal Complex, supposed to be the transit point for radioactive waste, never started.

== Gallery ==
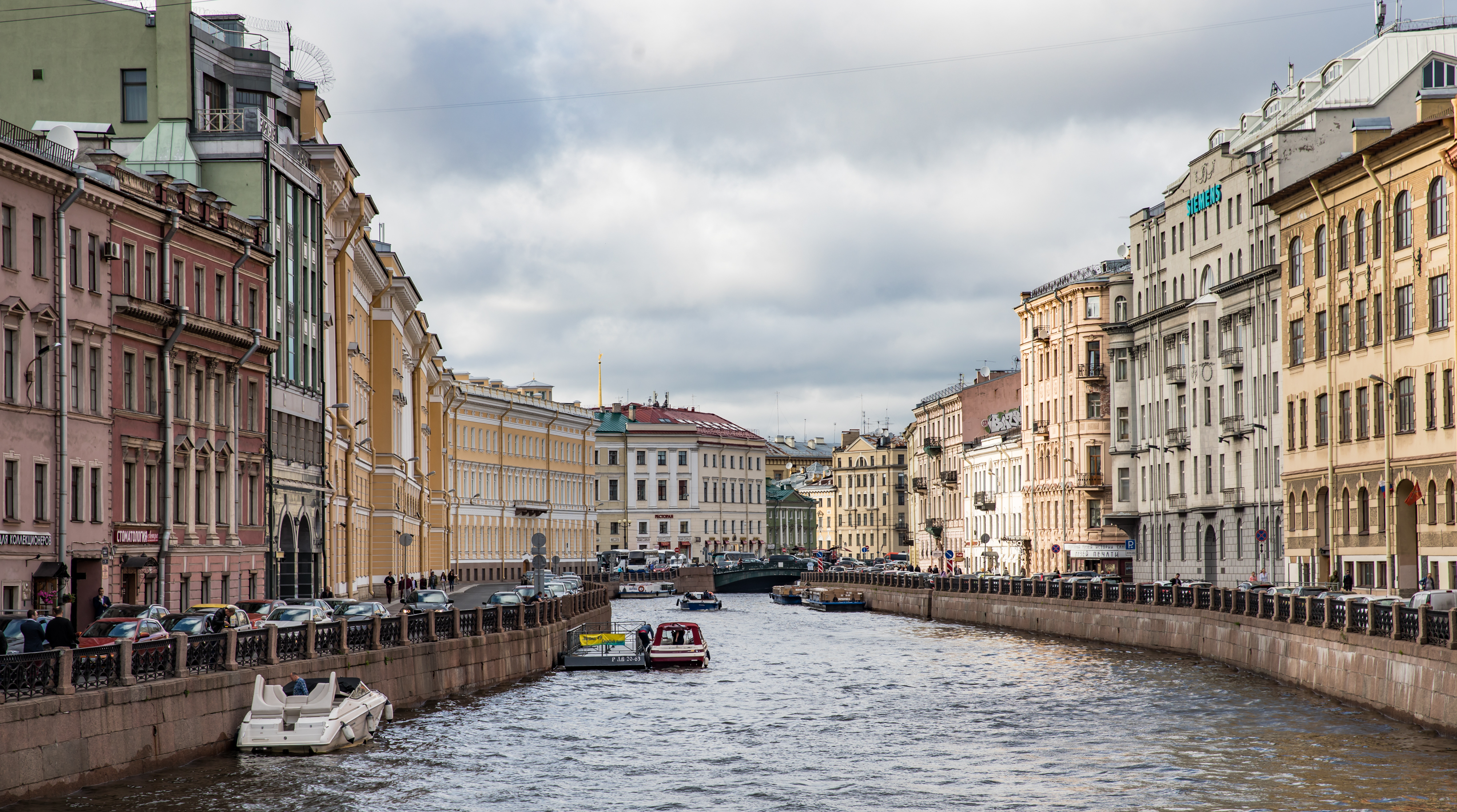
Moyka, Saint Petersburg, Russia

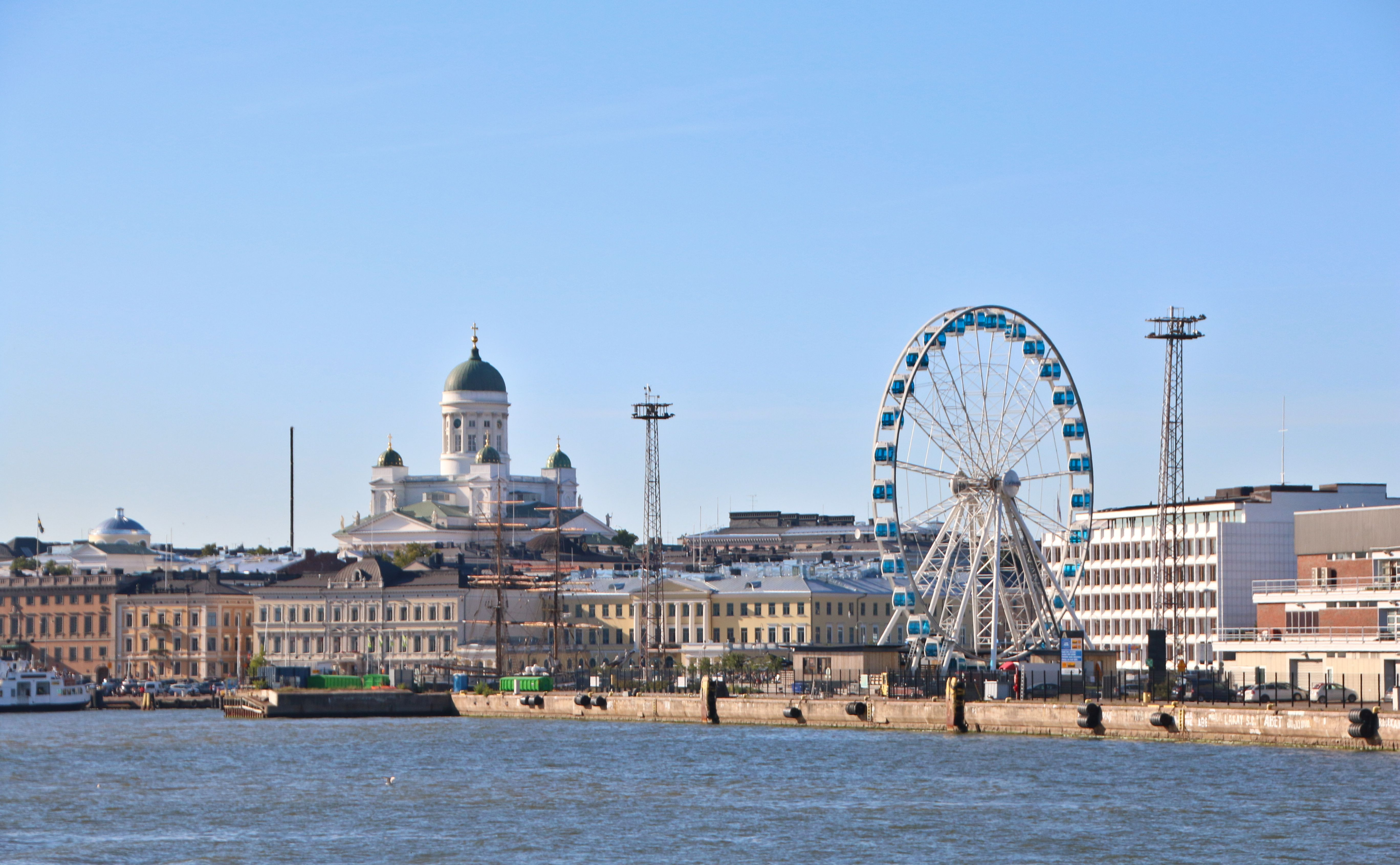
View of Helsinki, Finland

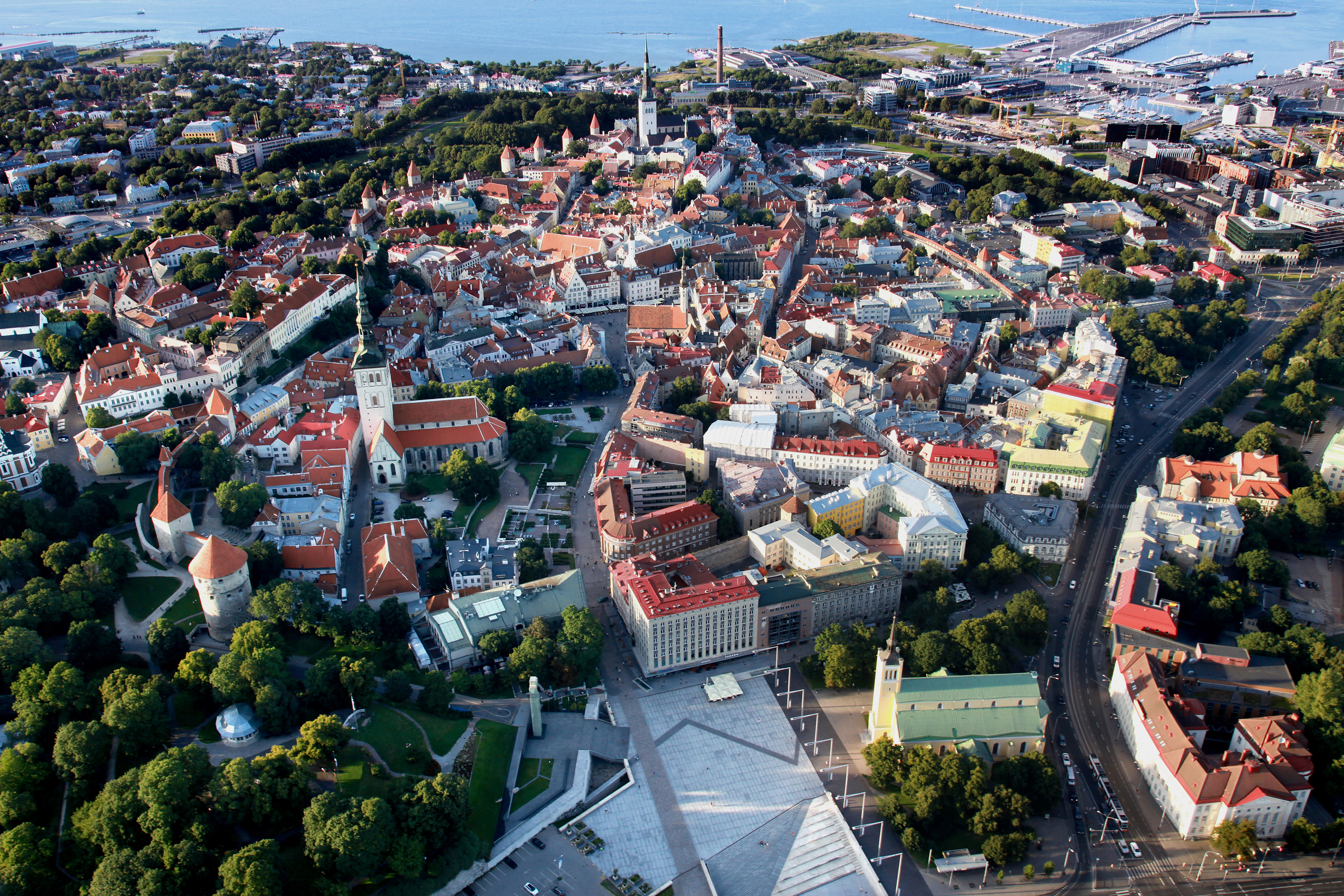
Tallinn Old Town, Estonia

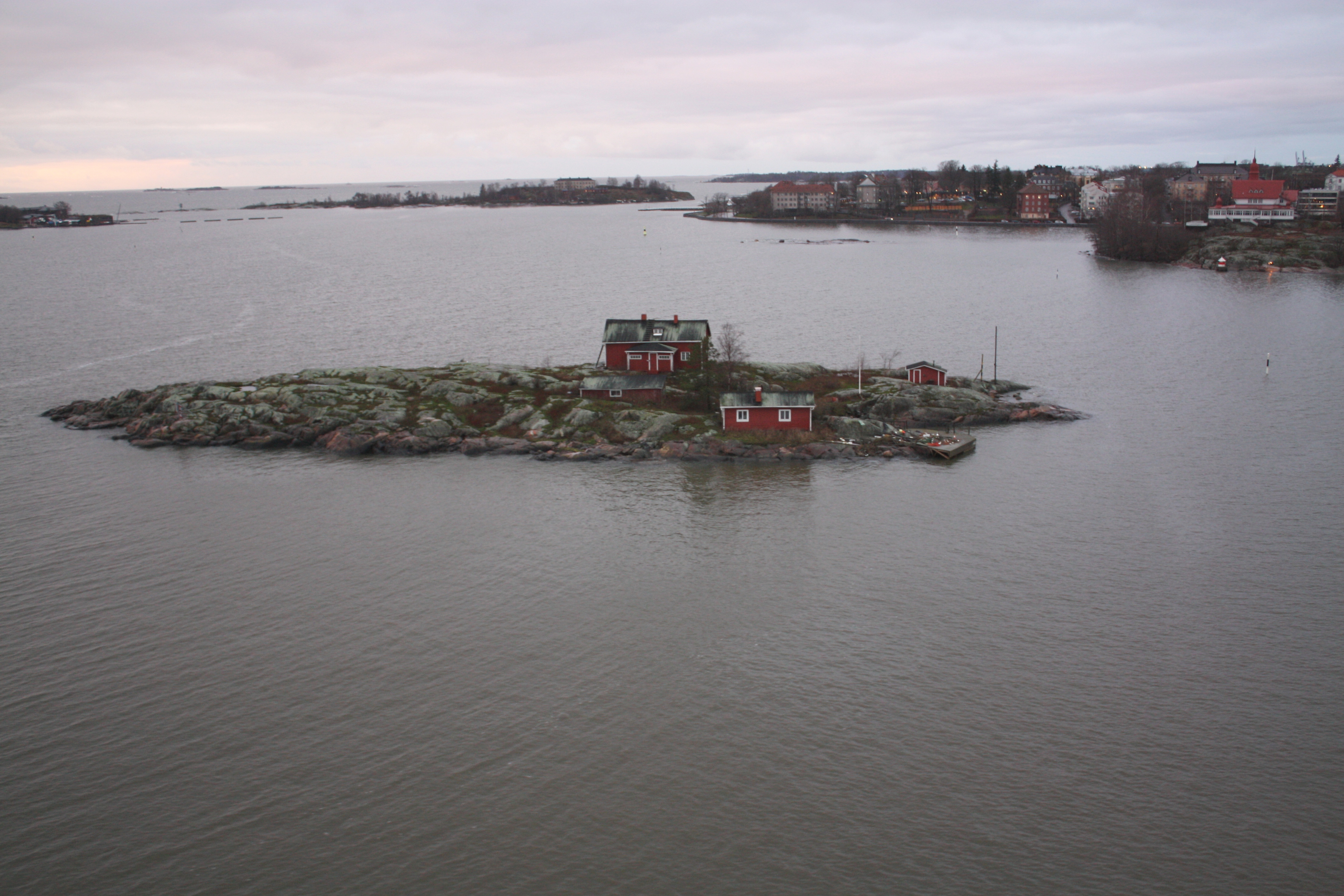
Ryssänsaari island near Helsinki

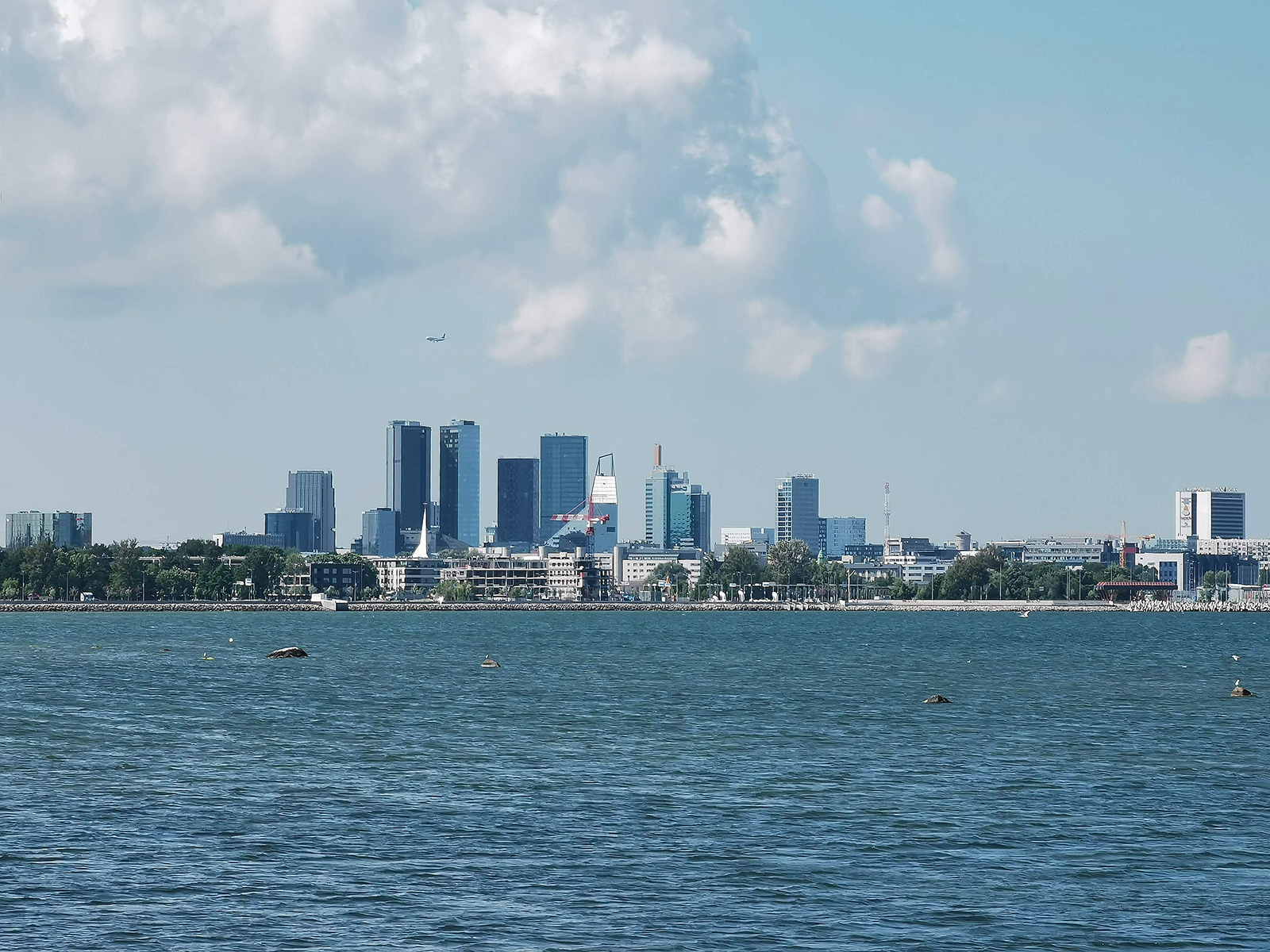
View of Tallinn Bay

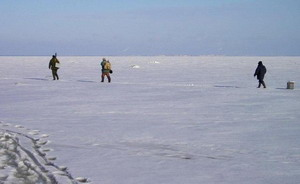
Fishermen on the Gulf of Finland

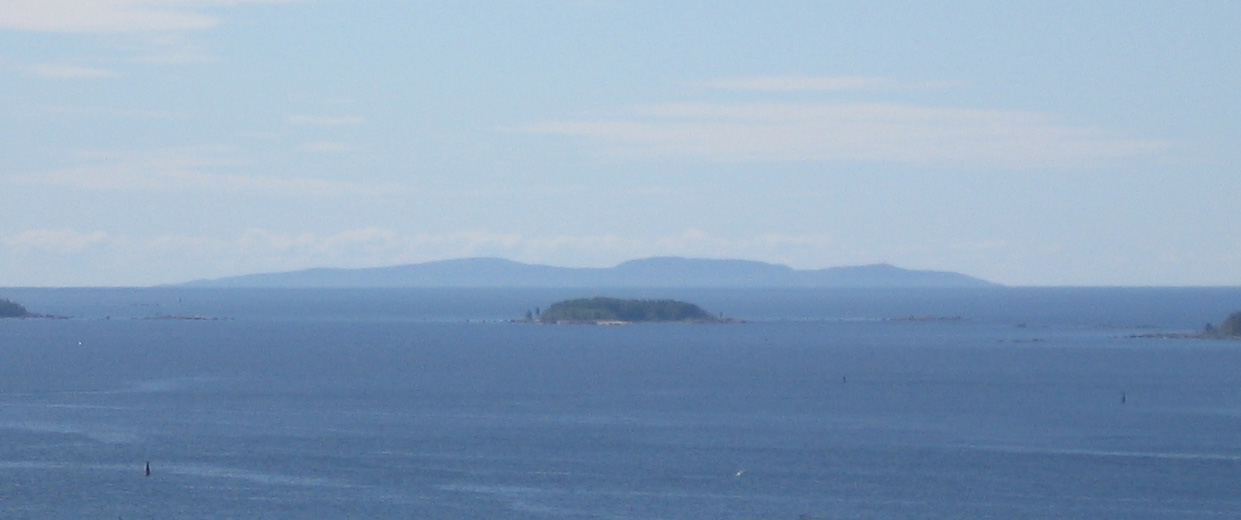
Hogland island on horizon (view from Kotka)

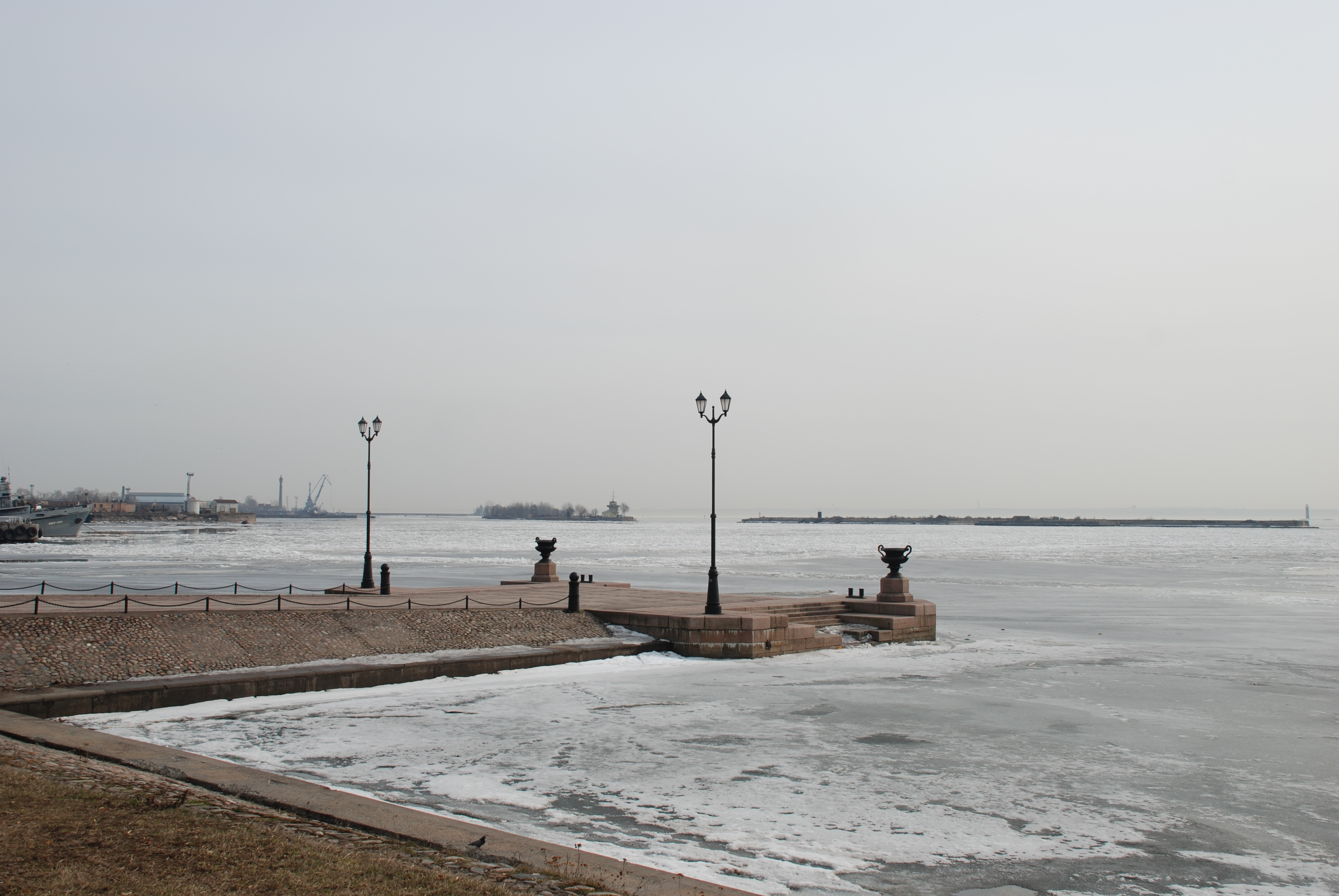
Kronstadt harbour in winter

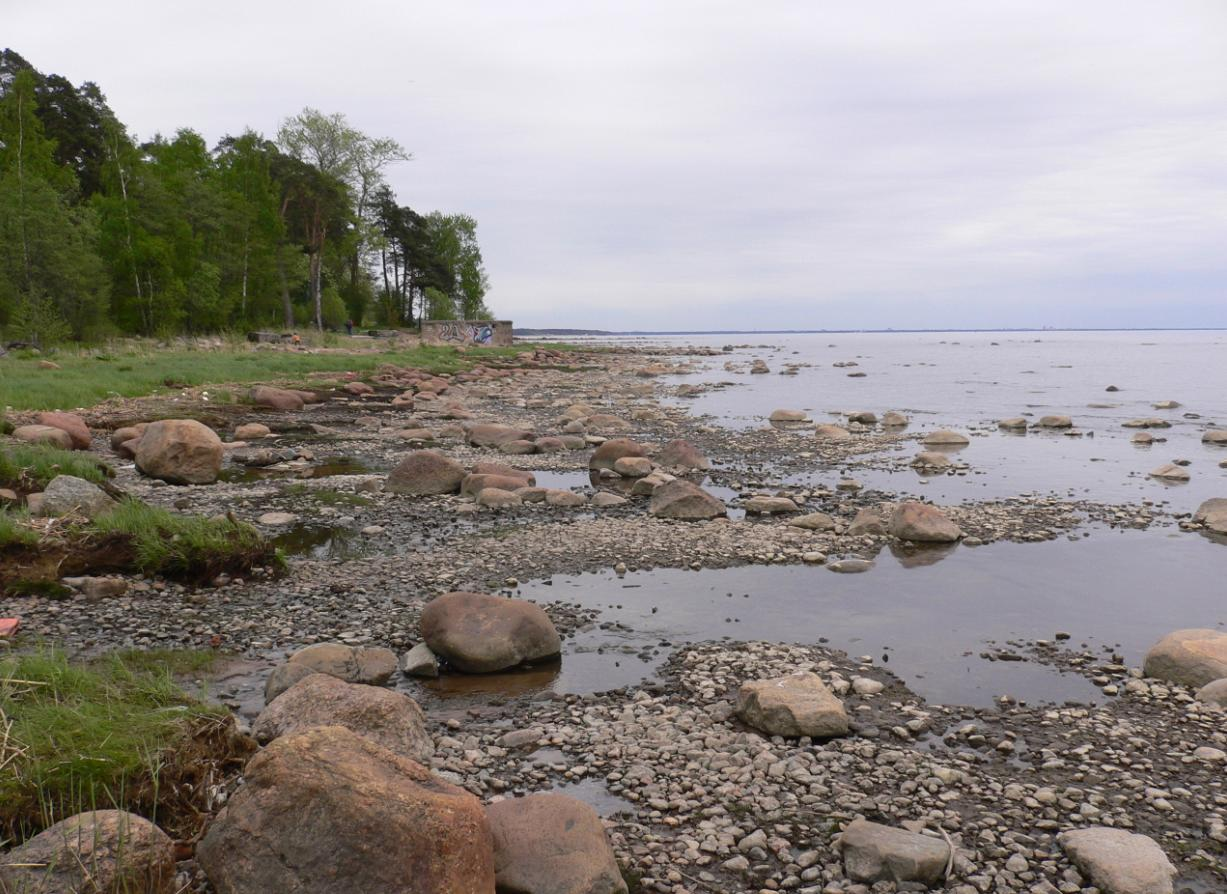
Gulf coast near Komarovo

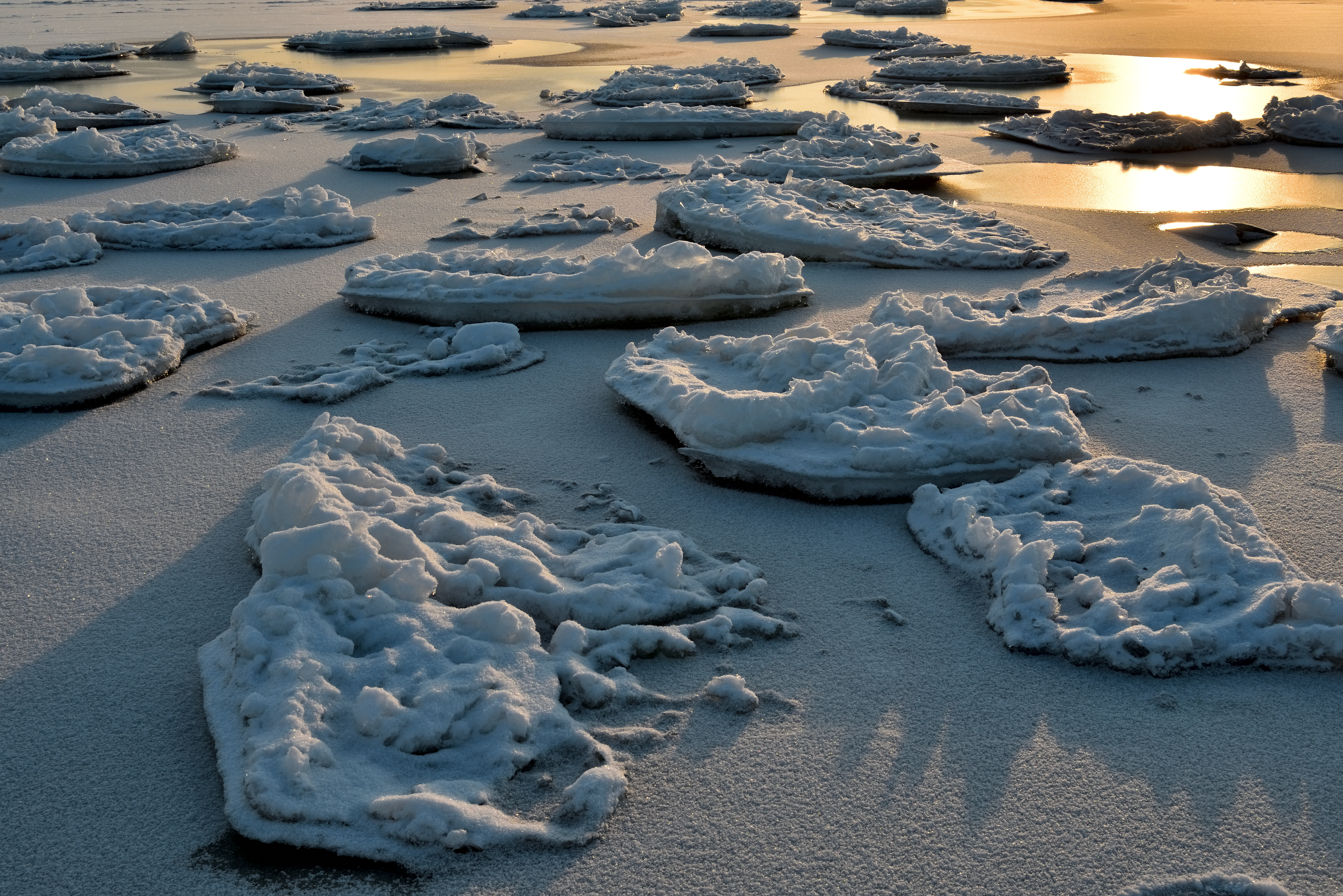
Ice off the coast of Komarovo at sunset

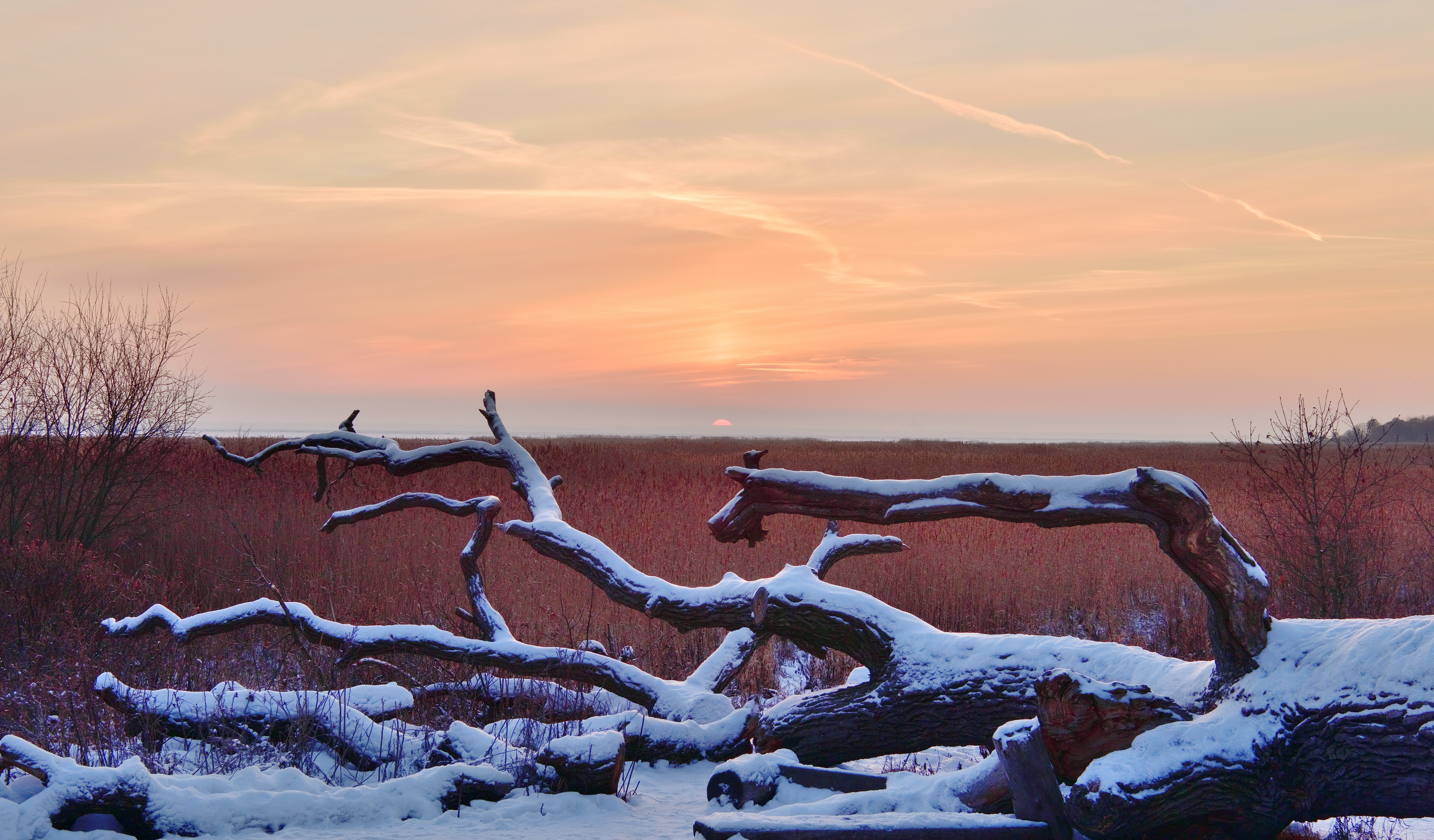
Northern coast of the Neva Bay

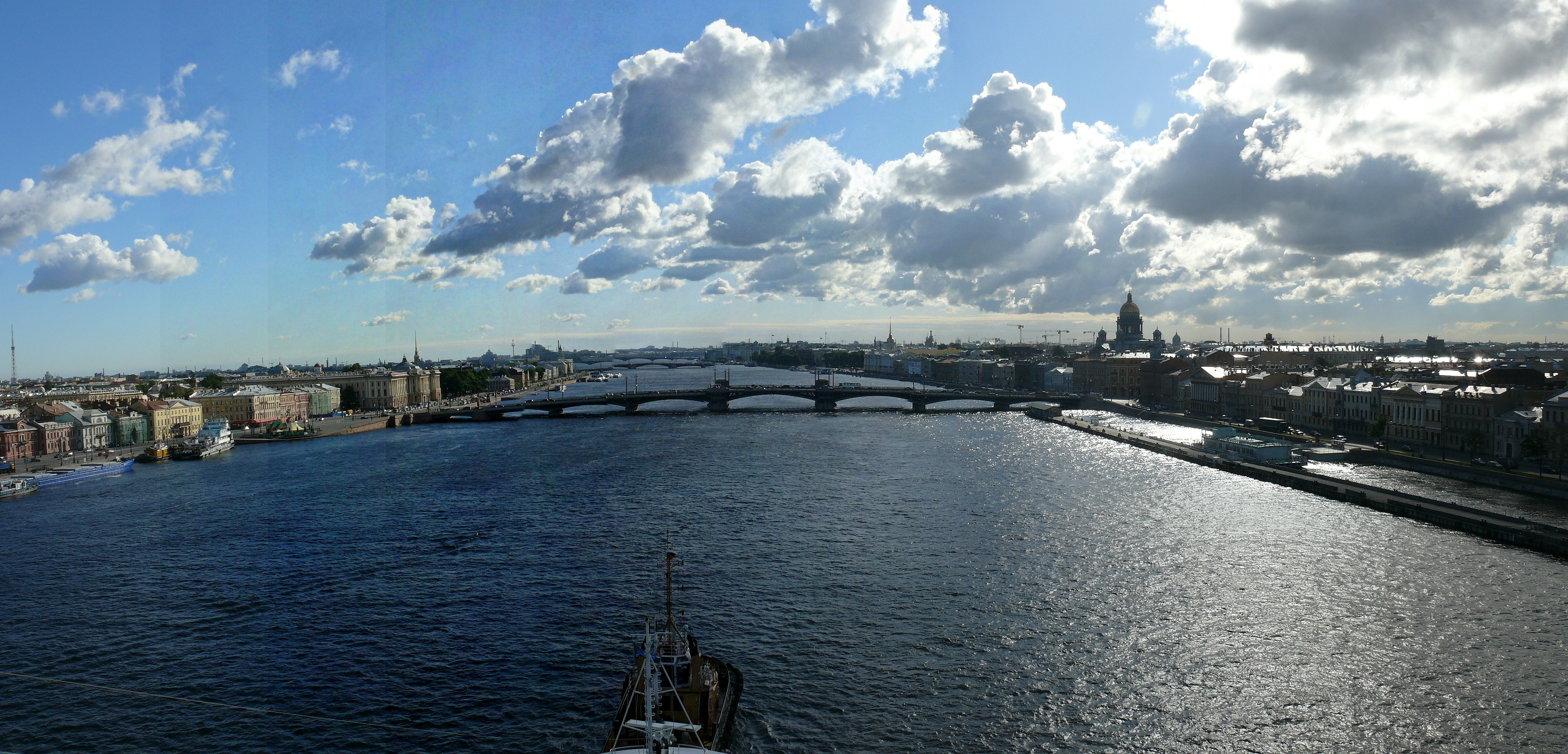
Panoramic view of Neva river

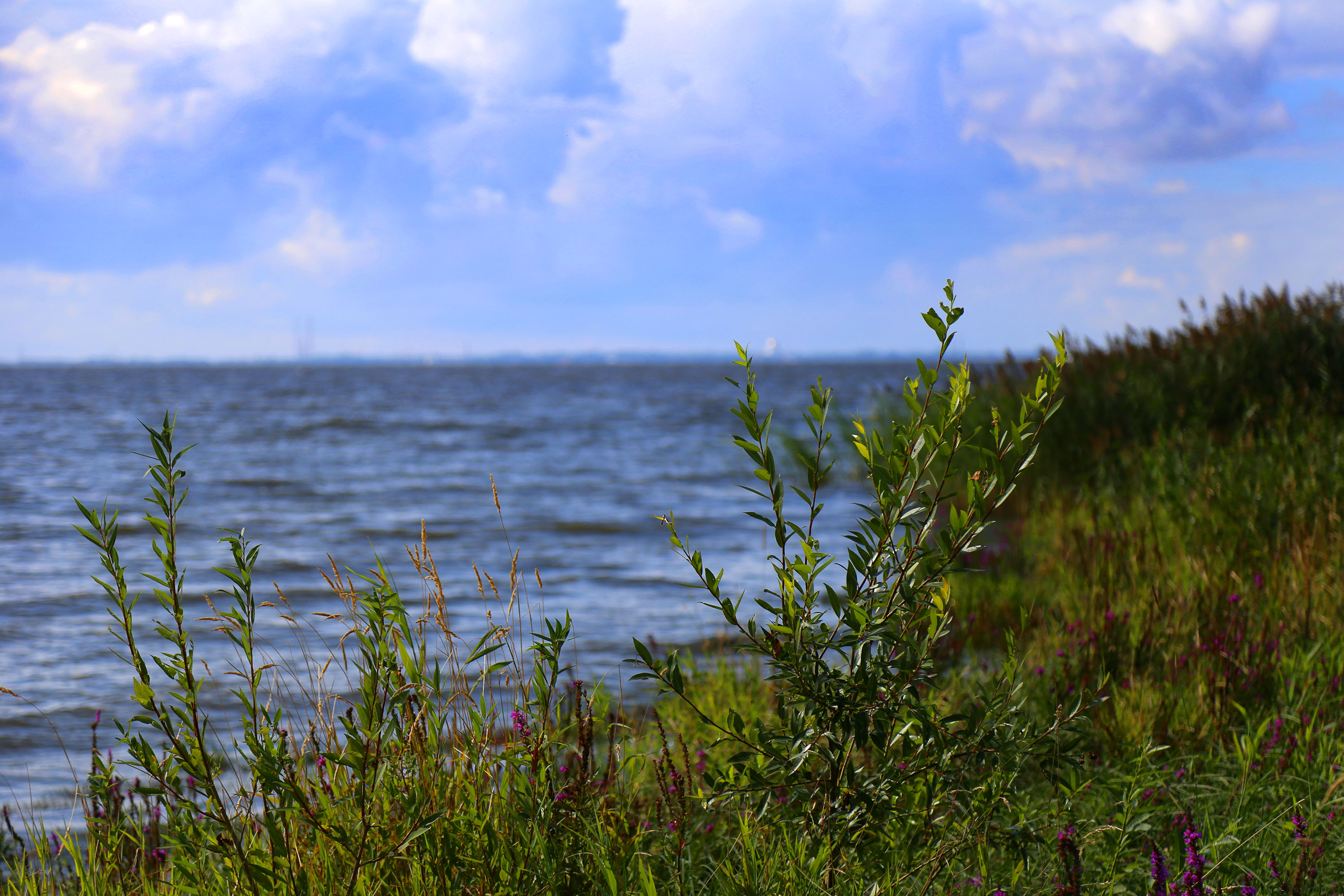
The "Fox Beach" by the Gulf in Saint Petersburg

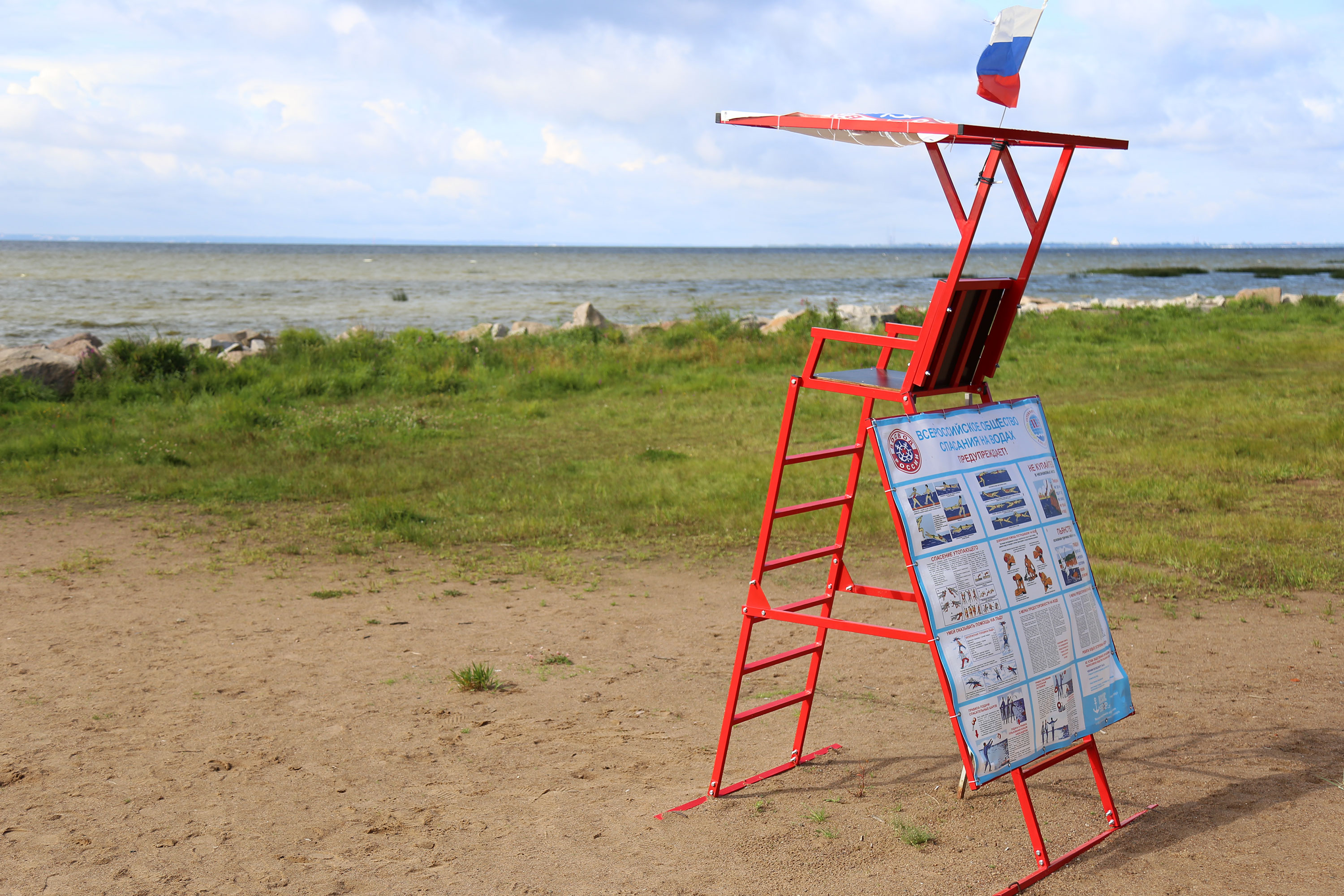
Beach («Морские Дубки») by the Gulf in Saint Petersburg

== Major cities ==
- Espoo
- Hamina
- Hanko
- Helsinki
- Kirkkonummi
- Kotka
- Kronstadt
- Kunda
- Loksa
- Lomonosov
- Loviisa
- Maardu
- Narva-Jõesuu
- Paldiski
- Peterhof
- Porvoo
- Primorsk
- Saint Petersburg
- Sestroretsk
- Sillamäe
- Sosnovy Bor
- Tallinn
- Vyborg
- Zelenogorsk

== See also ==
- Kiperort Peninsula
- Kven Sea
- Peter the Great's Naval Fortress
