= Kolga Bay Landscape Conservation Area =

Protected area in Estonia

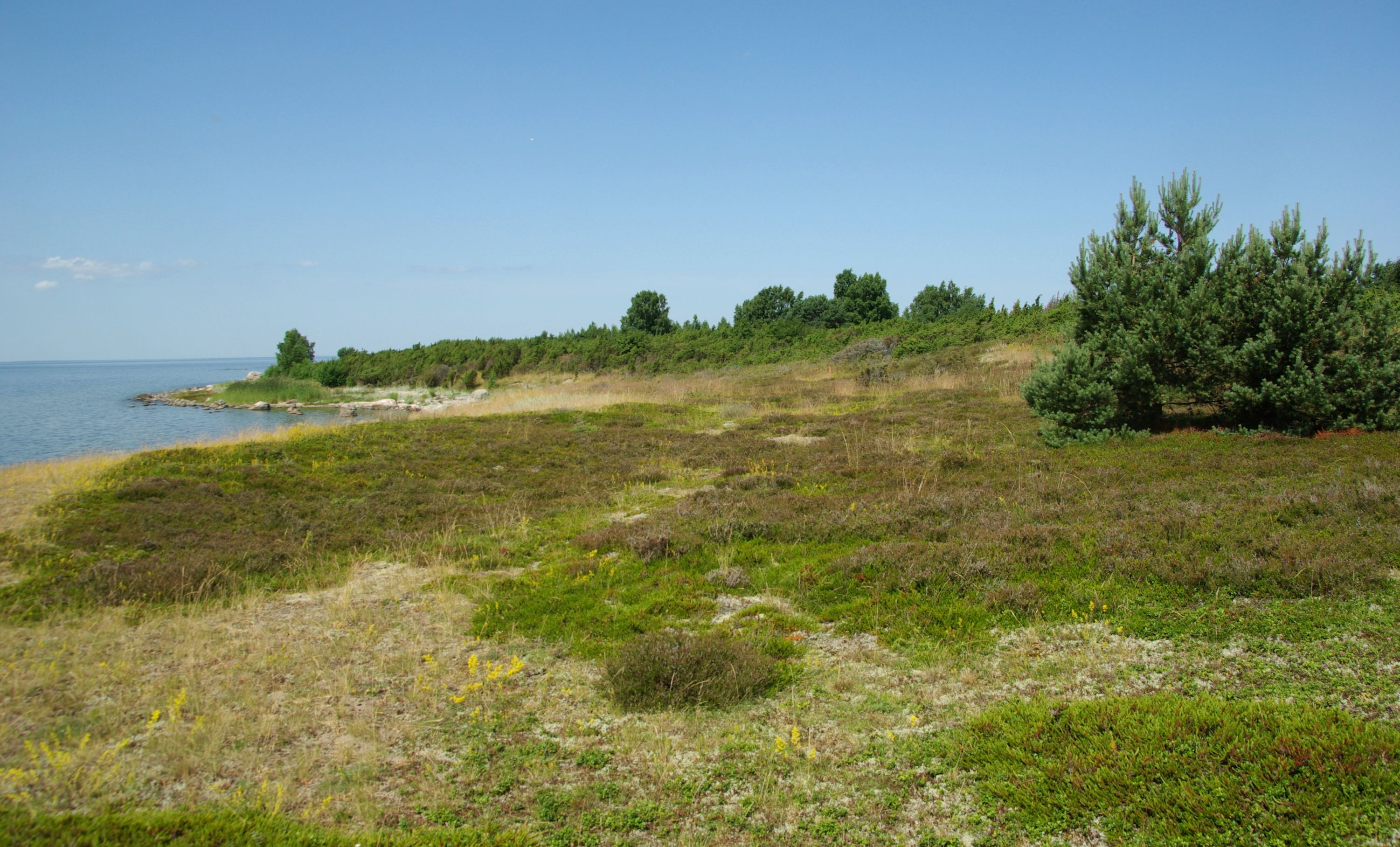

- Location within Estonia
- Location: Estonia
- Coordinates: 59°33′50″N 25°14′45″E
- Area: 1,933 ha (4,780 acres)
- Established: 1991 (1999)

Kolga Bay Landscape Conservation Area is a nature park situated in Harju County, Estonia. Its area is 1933 ha.

== Environment ==
The protected area was designated in 1991 to protect Kolga Bay and its surrounding areas. In 1999, the protected area was redesigned to the landscape conservation area. The islands in the bay have been designated an Important Bird Area (IBA) by BirdLife International because they support breeding populations of little and Arctic terns.
