= Rammu =

Island in Estonia

- Village
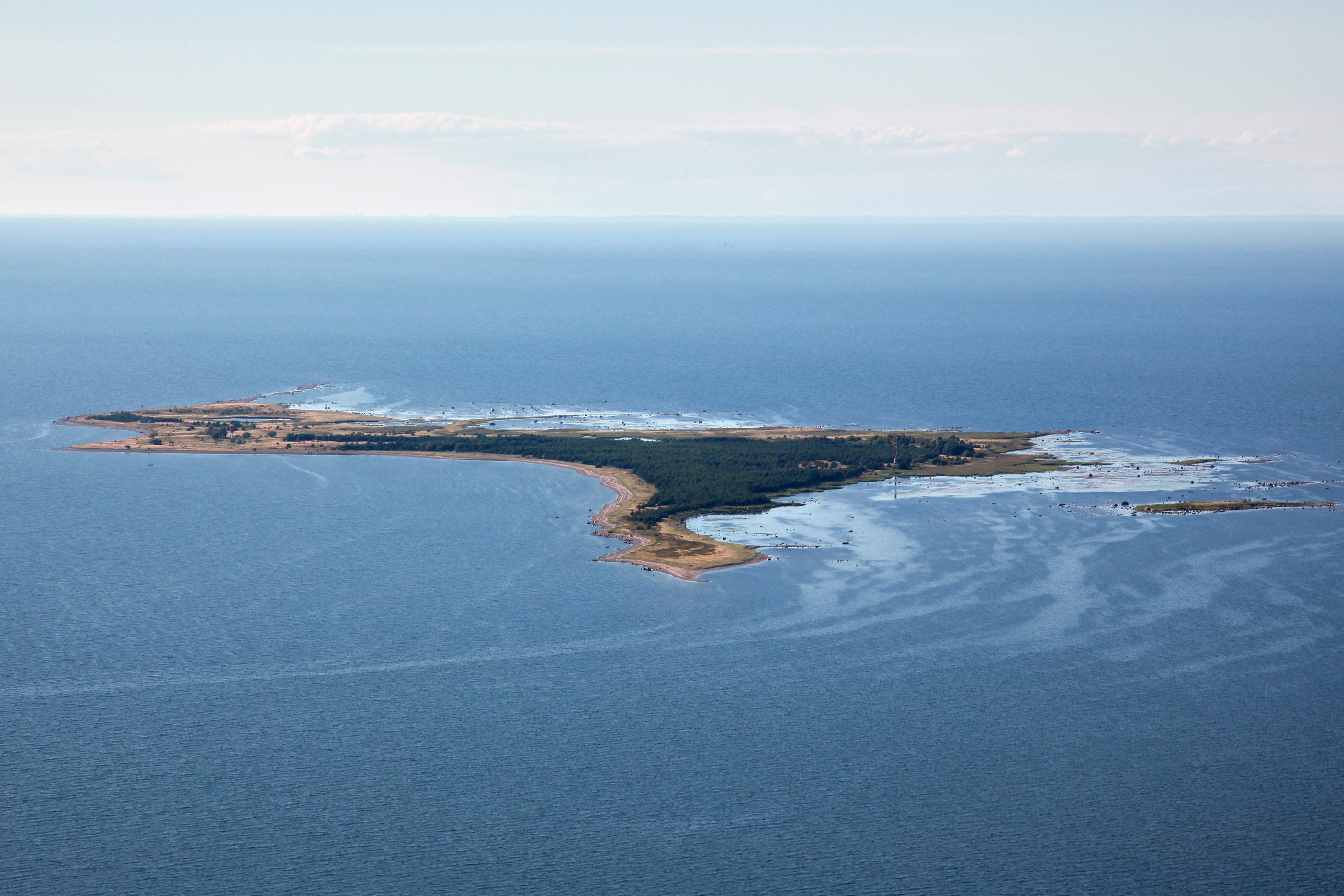

- Location in Estonia
- Coordinates: 59°34′24″N 25°12′38″E
- Country: Estonia
- County: Harju County
- Municipality: Jõelähtme Parish

Population (01.01.2010)
  - Total: 0

Rammu (Swedish: Ramö) is an island in Kolga Bay and is a part of Jõelähtme Parish, Harju County in northern Estonia.

== Gallery ==
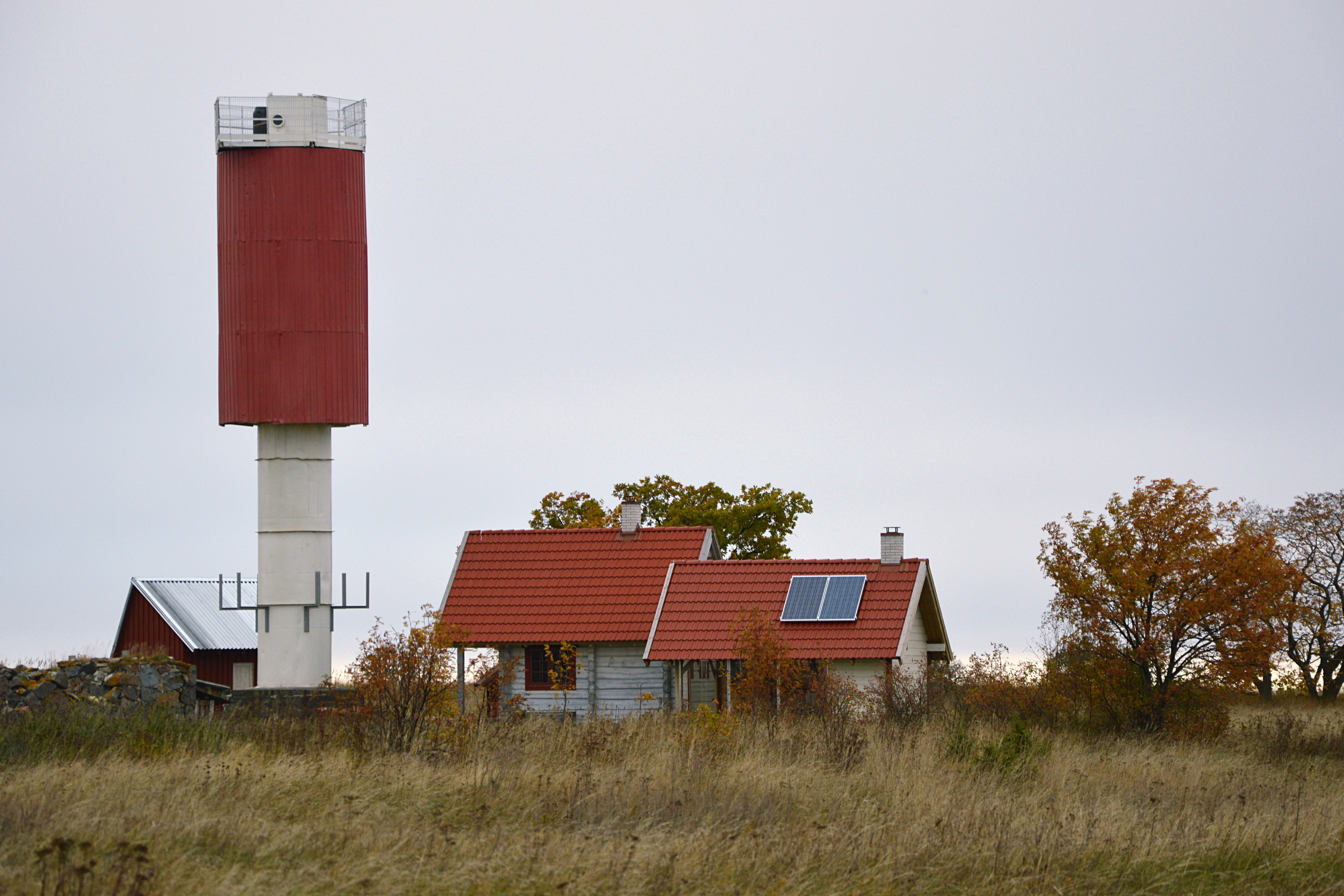

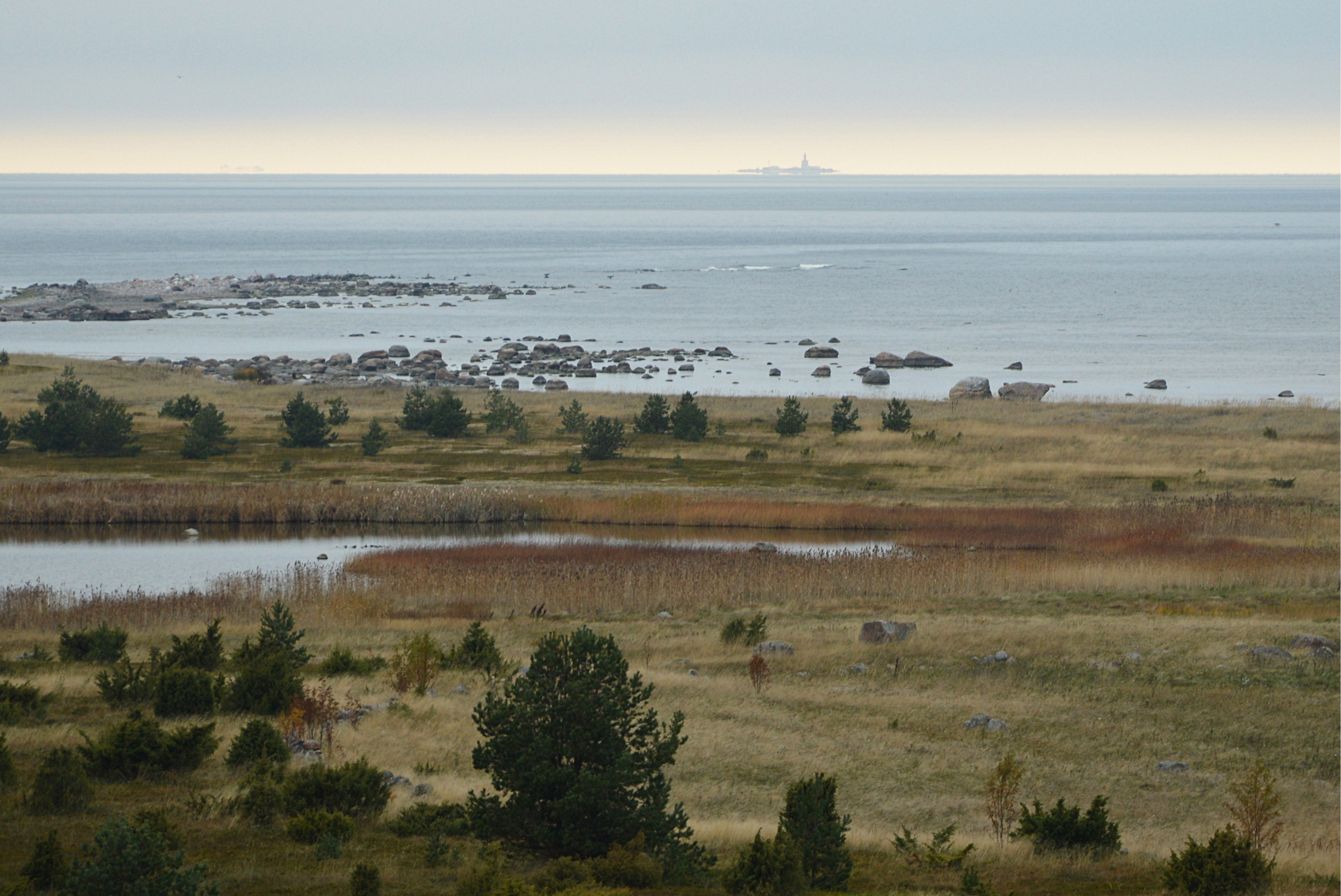

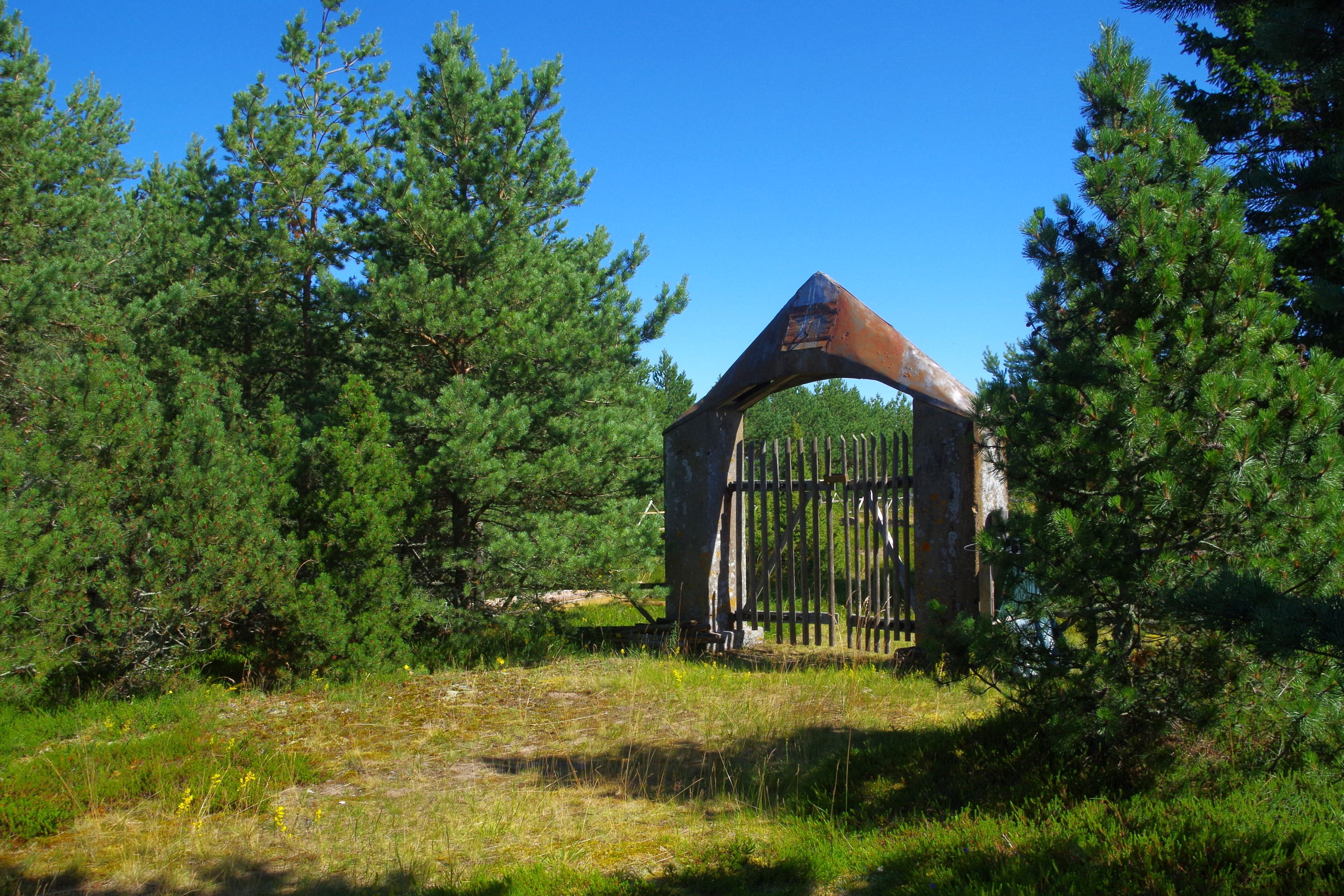
