= Malusi islands =

Island group in Estonia

Coordinates: 59°36′34″N 25°19′29″E

Location map

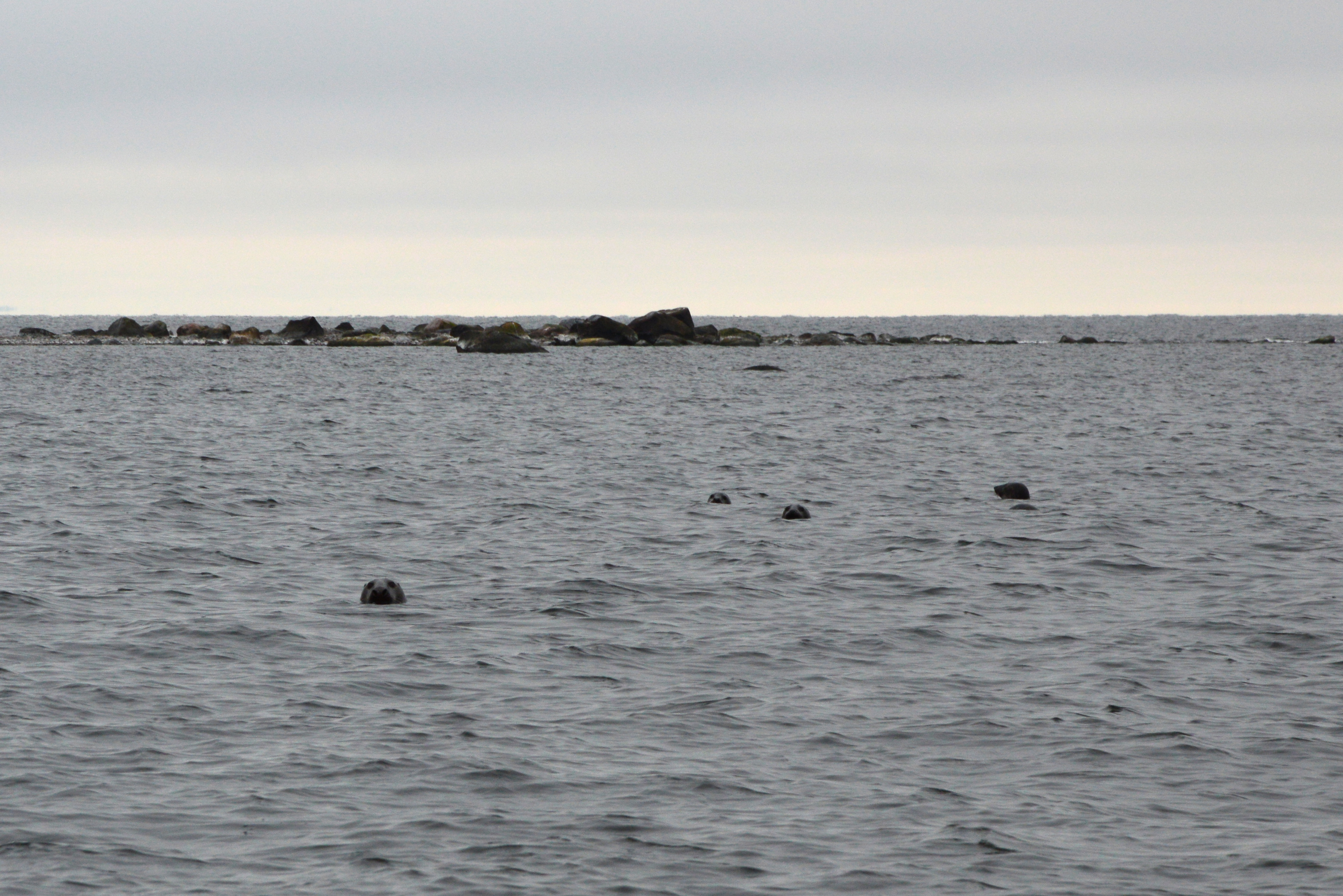
The Malusi islands are one of the main habitats of grey seals in the Gulf of Finland.

The Malusi islands (Estonian: Malusi saared) are an archipelago in Gulf of Finland, administratively belonging to Estonia. The archipelago consists of three islands: Põhja-Malusi 'North Malusi', Vahekari 'Middle Reef', and Lõuna-Malusi 'South Malusi'.

== Nature ==
The islands are one of the main habitats of Estonian grey seals in the Gulf of Finland. Many of them are found on the Malusi islands because they are protected seal breeding areas.

Some species, such as wild strawberries and whortleberry, have disappeared.
