= Spithami =

Village in Estonia

Coordinates: 59°13′N 23°32′E

- Village
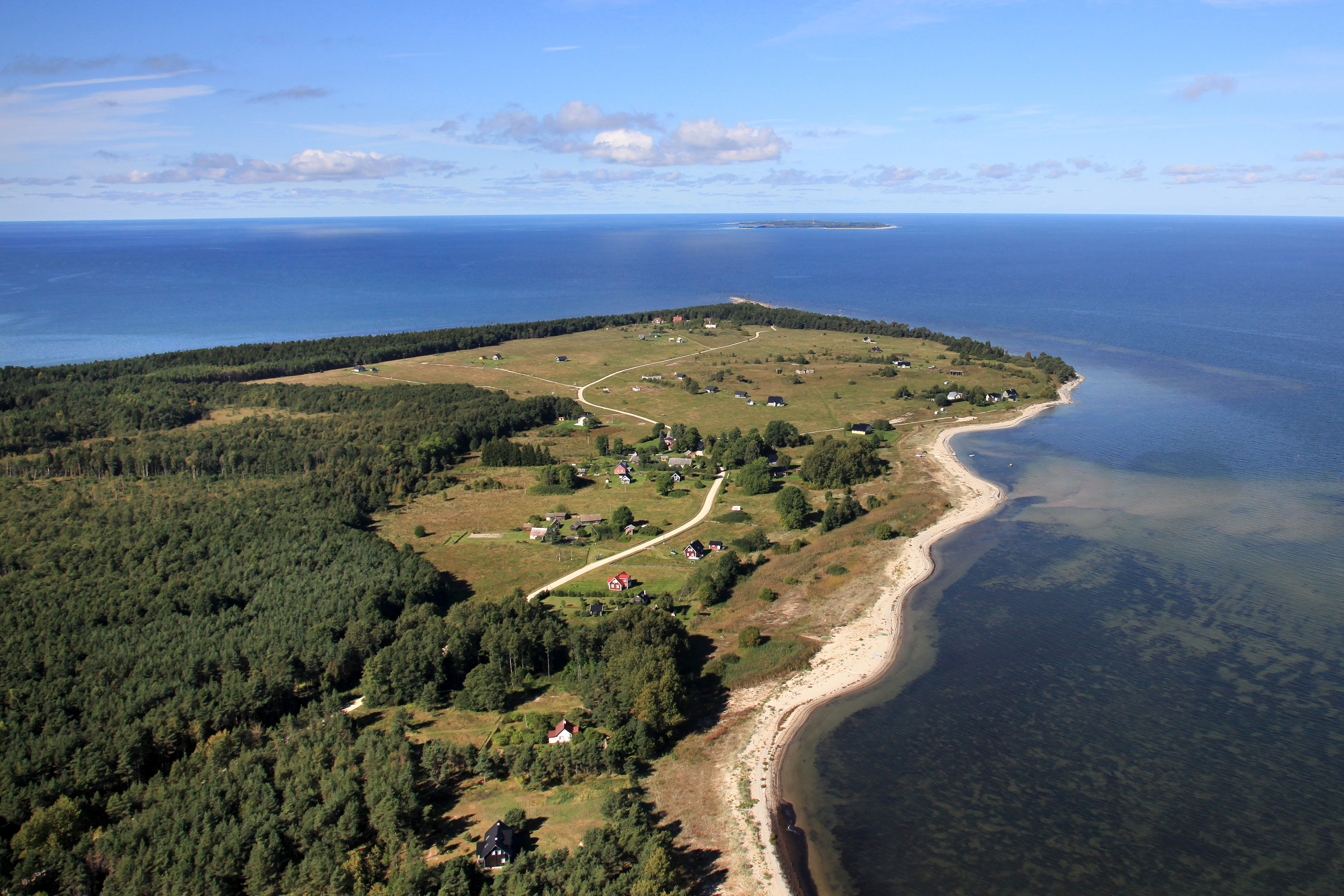
- Põõsaspea cape in Spithami
- Interactive map of Spithami
- Country: Estonia
- County: Lääne
- Parish: Lääne-Nigula
- Time zone: UTC+2 (EET)
  - Summer (DST): UTC+3 (EEST)

Spithami (Swedish: Spithamn) is a village in Lääne-Nigula Parish, Lääne County, in northwestern Estonia. It was inhabited by Estonian Swedes until World War II. During Soviet rule it was a military area in which civilian entry was banned.

Earlier forms of the village's name include Spithaven, Spithave, Spithaff (all mentioned in 1514), Spythave (1564), Spiuthampn, Spithaven (both 1565) and Spiuthambre (1798). In Estonian, the village has been also called Põõsaspea (mentioned as Põesapi in 1922) before moving to the current form, which is an Estonian spelling of the original Swedish toponym. Nowadays the name Põõsaspea only indicates a nearby cape situated inside the village's borders.

== Pictures ==
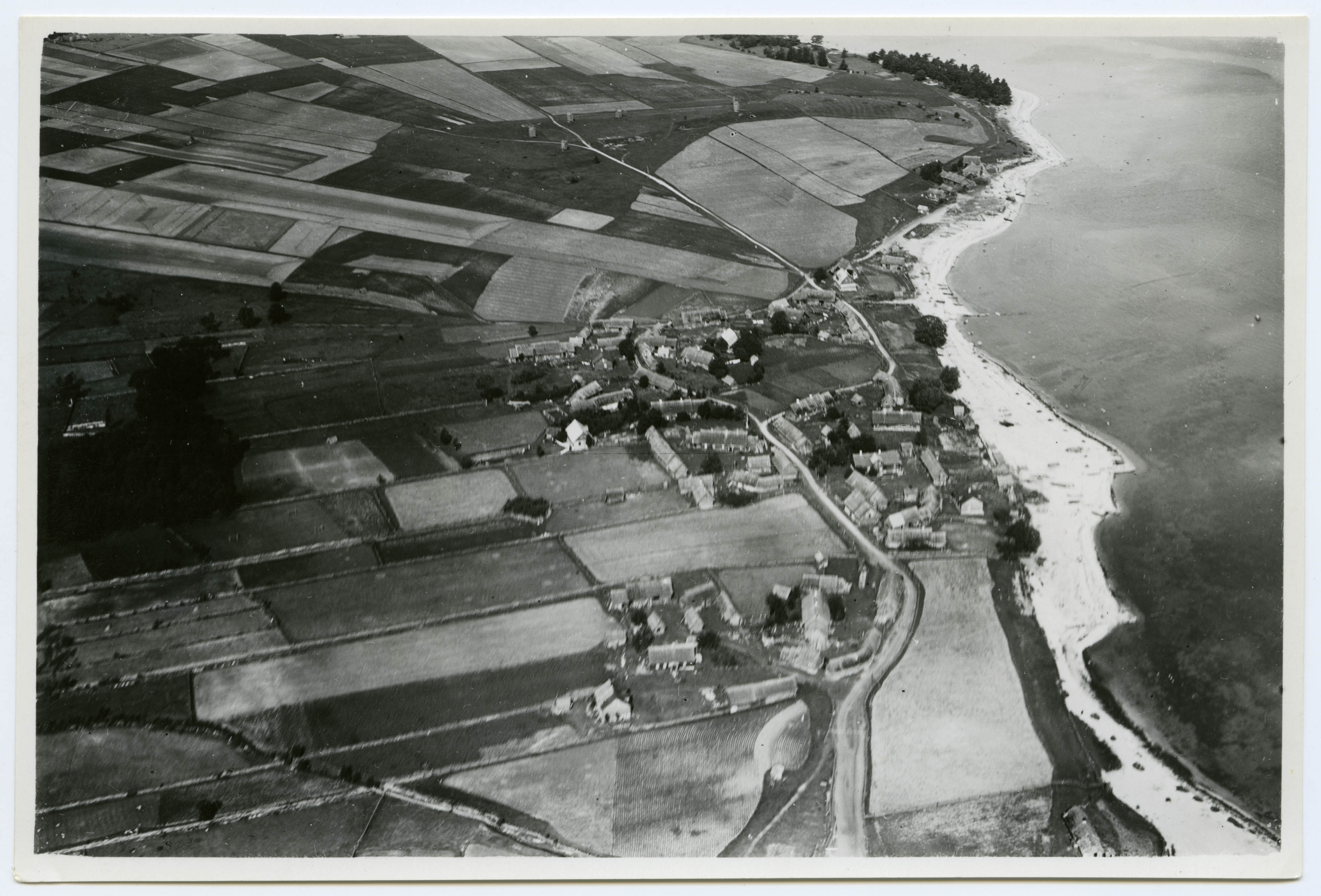
Põõsapää küla (Spithamnsbyn) in 1934
