= Rohusi =

Village in Estonia

- Village
- Location in Estonia
- Coordinates: 59°31′17″N 25°18′46″E
- Country: Estonia
- County: Harju County
- Municipality: Jõelähtme Parish

Rohusi is an island and a village in Jõelähtme Parish, Harju County in northern Estonia, located in the Kolga Bay. Since 1999, when a company owned by Tiit Vähi OÜ Merilaine bought it, the island has been a private property.
