= Norre Katts Park =

Coordinates: 56°40′43″N 12°51′37″E

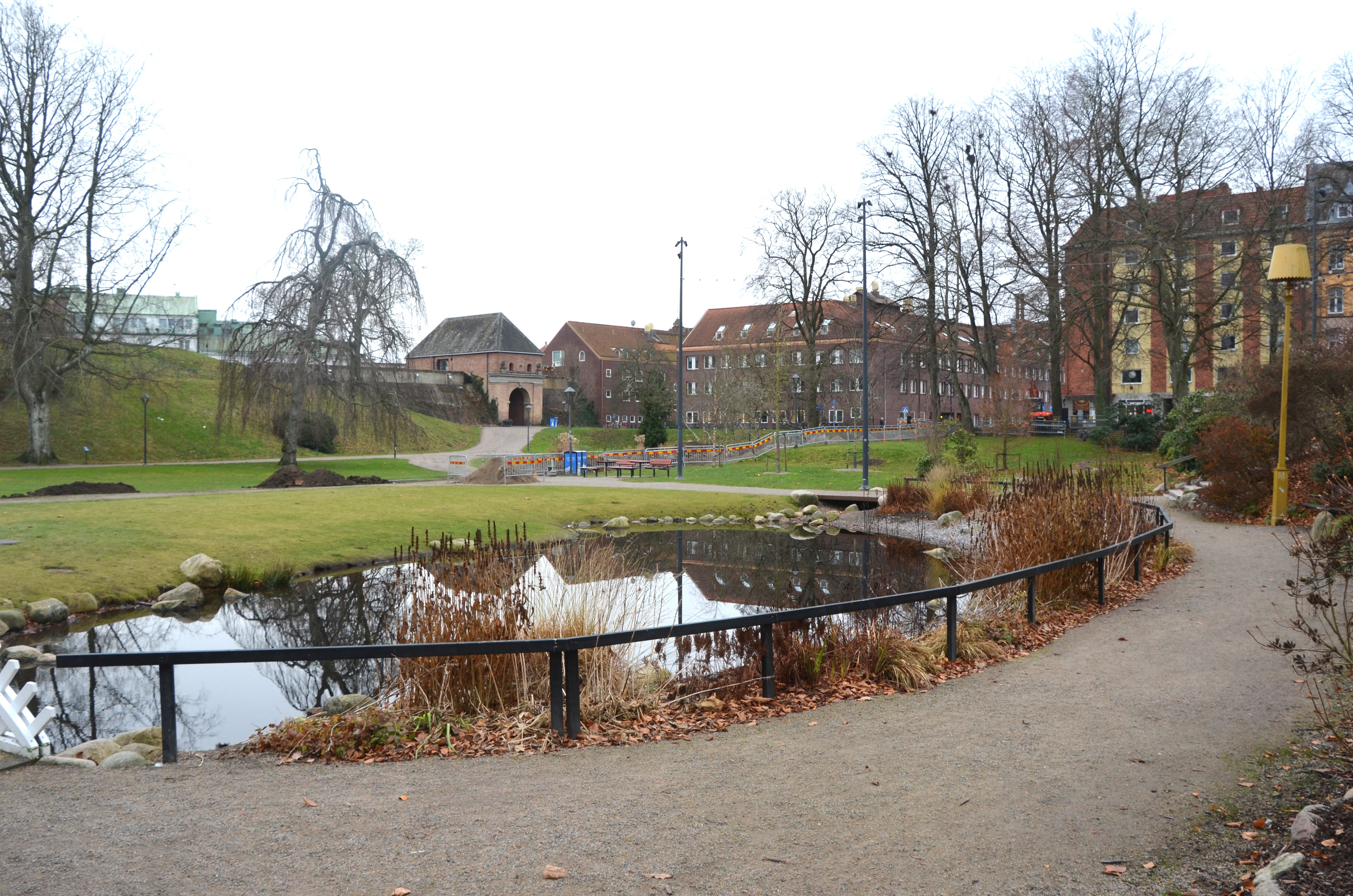
- Southern part of Norre Katts Park seen towards Norre Port
- Interactive map of Norre Katts Park
- Type: Urban park
- Location: Halmstad
- Created: 1843
- Owner: Halmstad Municipality
Norre Katts Park
- Interactive map of Norre Katts Park

Norre Katts Park is a park in central Halmstad, Sweden, located just north of the Norre Port, part of Halmstad’s medieval fortifications. The park, which was known as Tivoli Park until 1918, is frequently used for various public celebrations.

== Gallery ==
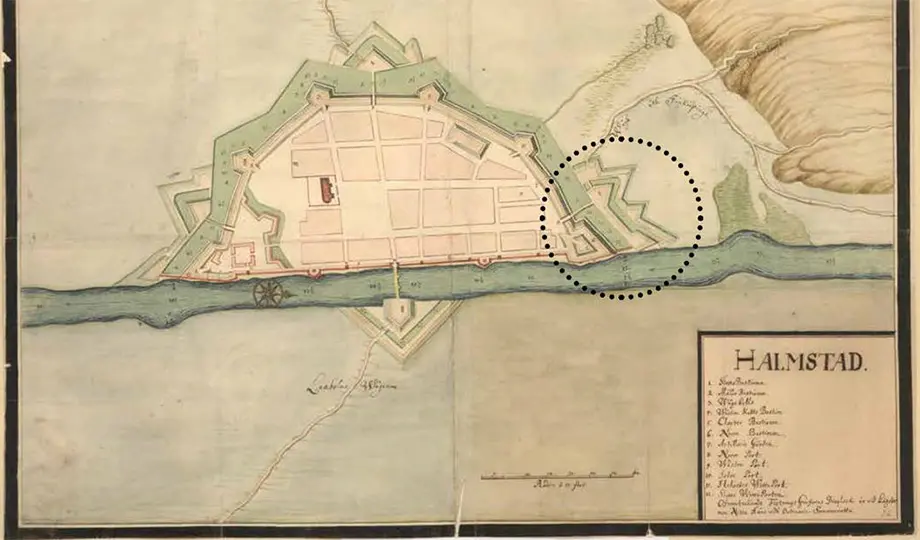
Map from the 1600s, with the Northern Bastion, the current location of Norre Katts Park circled in

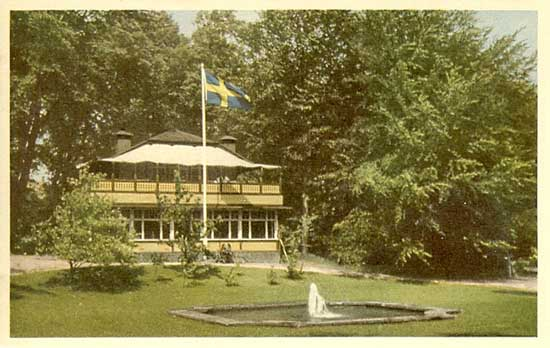
Café and reading room at Norre Katts park (1942)

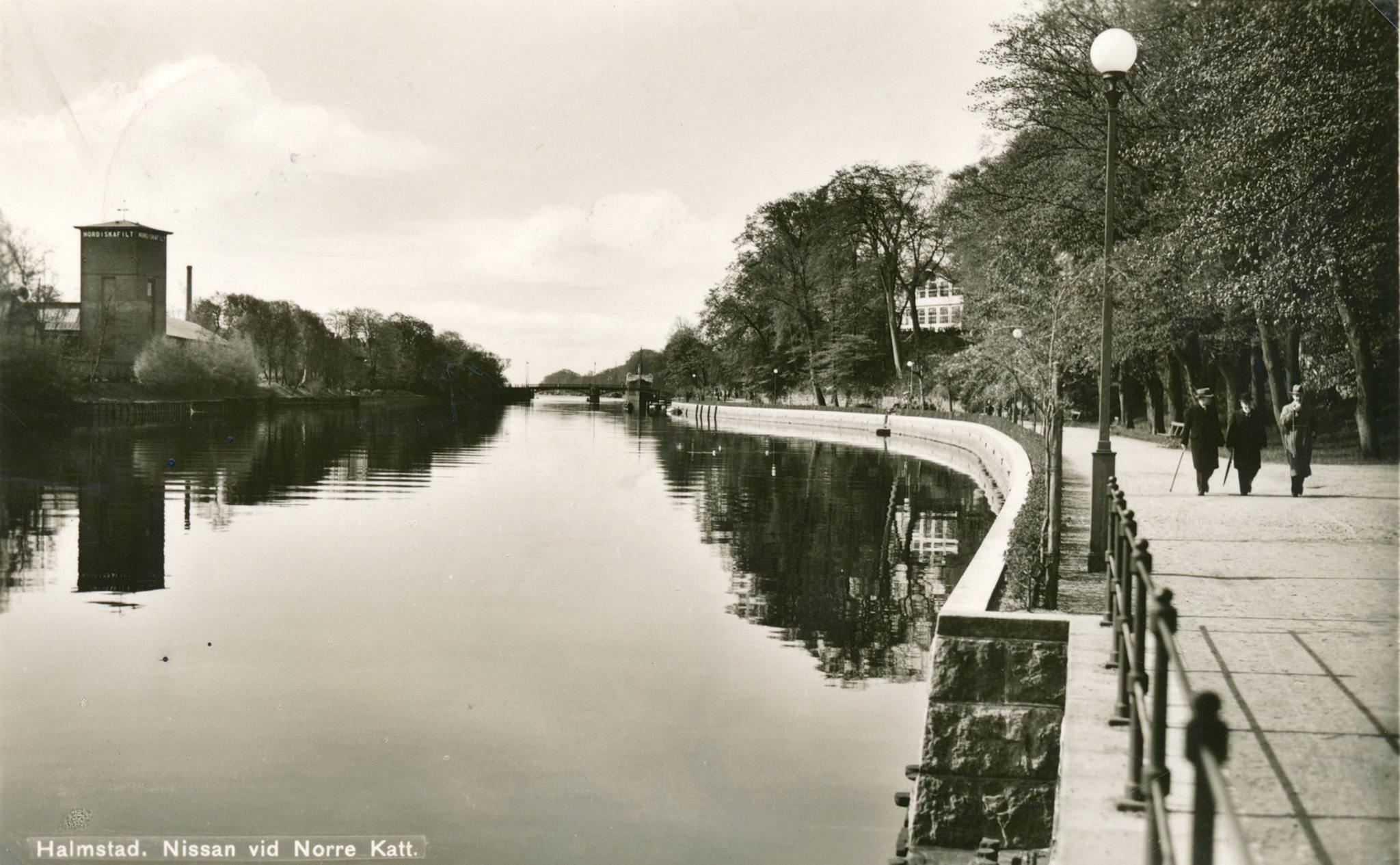
River by the park (1930s)

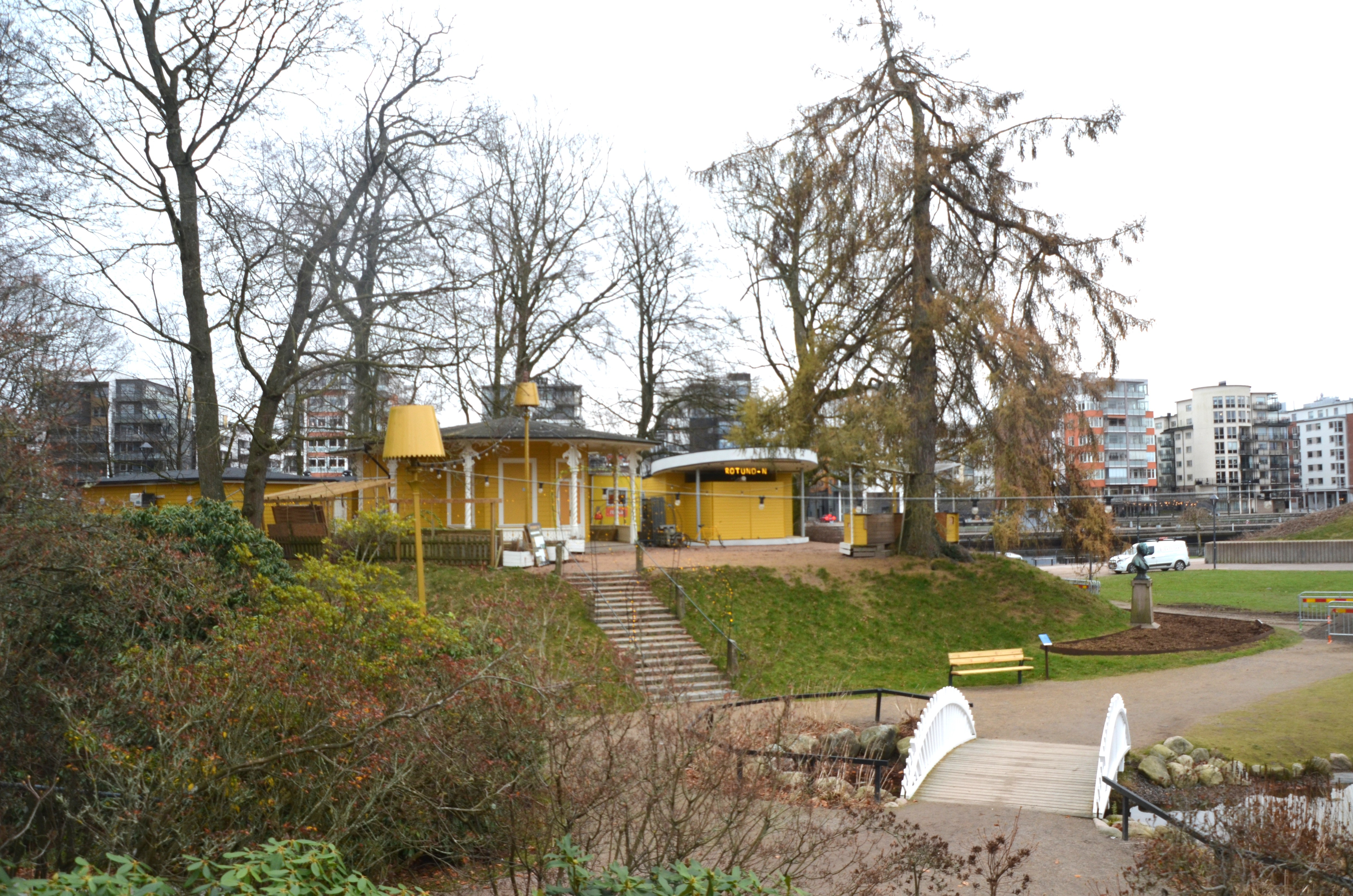
Cafe in the park (2024)
