= Cuba Cola =

Cola-flavoured soft drink produced in Sweden

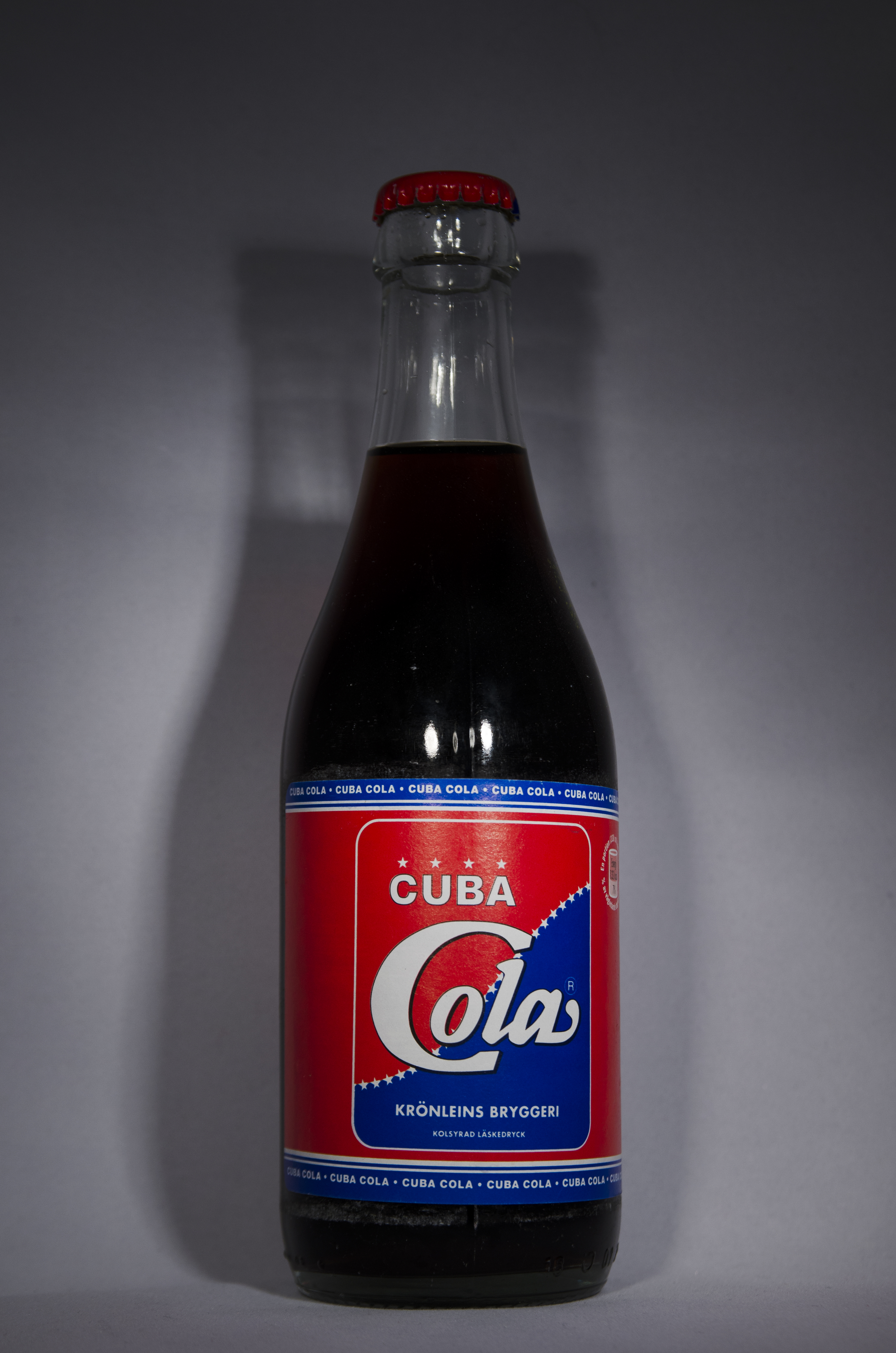
- Type: soft drink
- Manufacturer: Spendrups
- Distributor: Vasa bryggeri, Heines bryggeri, Guttsta Källa and Krönleins
- Country of origin: Sweden
- Introduced: 1953; 72 years ago
- Flavour: cola
- Related products: Coca-Cola

Cuba Cola is a cola-flavoured soft drink produced in Sweden, manufactured by Spendrups. Earlier bottled by Saturnus AB. It was introduced to the market in the summer of 1953, soon after cola drinks had become legal in Sweden, and three months before Coca-Cola was launched in Sweden.

The recipe was owned by Saturnus AB of Malmö and it was brewed on license by Vasa bryggeri, Hammars bryggeri, Heines bryggeri, Guttsta Källa and Krönleins. Cuba Cola got a new recipe in 2020 and at the same time the bottles got a new retro design by Spendrups.

The soft drink was named Cuba Cola only because Cuba was considered exotic during the 1950s.
