= Sannarpsgymnasiet =

Coordinates: 56°40′38.86″N 12°53′35.93″E

- Frennarpsvägen 8 Halmstad 302 44

Information
- Type: High School; day
- Established: 1969; 57 years ago
- Grades: 1–3
- Gender: Coeducational
- Enrollment: around 1,200
- Average class size: 20-30 students
- Student to teacher ratio: 12:1
- Website: sannarp.nu

Sannarpsgymnasiet is a high school in Halmstad, Sweden. It offers a broad selection of courses, ranging from special school to International Baccalaureate. The school opened its main campus in August 1969, which underwent renovations in 2002.

== Kristinehedsgymnasiet ==
Kristinehedsgymnasiet is a campus of Sannarpsgymnasiet where the Vehicle and Transport Programme is provided. The campus originally opened in August 2019 as part of Kattegattgymnasiet and became part of Sannarpsgymnasiet in 2022. There are plans to expand the campus to also include the Building and Construction Programme which is currently part of Kattegattgymnasiet.

== Notable alumni ==
- Niclas Alexandersson
- Lena Andersson
- Dusan Djuric
- Göran Fritzon
- Carl Fredrik Graf
- Fredrik Ljungberg
- Susanne Ljungskog
- Ika Nord
- Tobias Persson
- Aida Hadžialić
- Samuel Hellström
- Johan Staël von Holstein
- Henrik von Sydow
- Peter Wahlbeck
- Erik Zsiga
- Pontus Ströbaek
- Joakim Nätterqvist
- Laila Bagge
- Sead Haksabanovic

== Notable teachers ==
- Laila Adèle
- Sten Fåhré
