= Brunnsåkersskolan =

School in Halmstad, Sweden

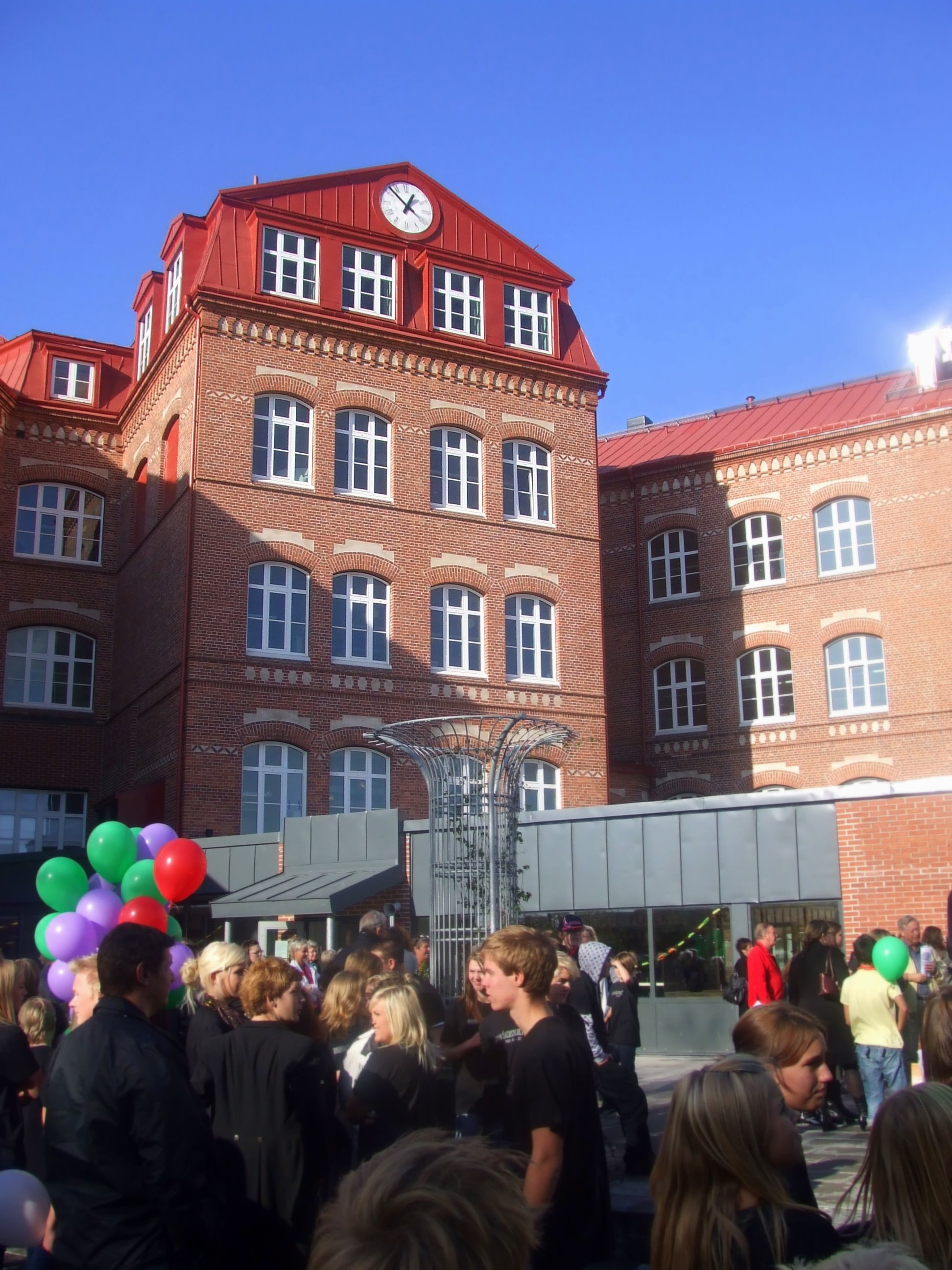
The school during the 100 year jubilee in 2008.

Brunnsåkersskolan is an elementary school for students in grade 4-9 in Halmstad, Sweden. Brunnsåkersskolan was originally a hospital built in 1908 but was later converted into a school.
