= Port of Halmstad =

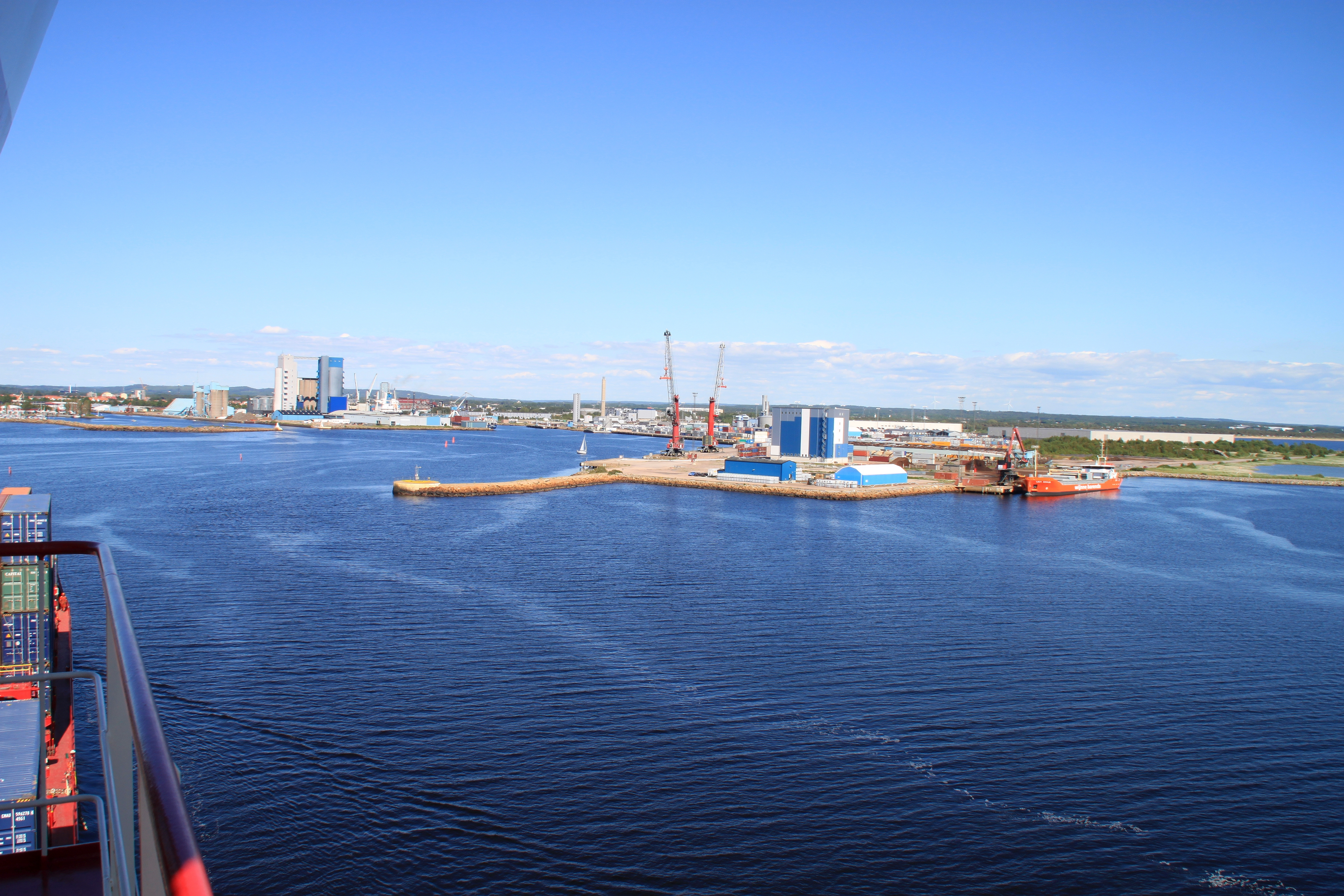
- Port entrance

Location
- Country: Sweden
- Location: Halmstad
- Coordinates: 56.653750°N 12.855806°E
- UN/LOCODE: SEHAD

Statistics
- Vessel arrivals: about 1200 ships (2023)
- Annual cargo tonnage: 2,3 million tons (2023)
- Passenger traffic: 79 379 (2023)
- Website; Official website

Port of Halmstad (Swedish: Halmstads hamn; Locode:Sehad) is the largest shipping port in Halland and one of the 10 largest seaports in Sweden. It is co-owned and managed by the Halmstad's and Varberg's municipal company Hallands Hamnar.

== Operations ==
It is primarily a logistics port with one regular passenger ferry line to Grenå in Denmark. Since 2020, Stena Line operates the route to Grenå with MS Stena Nautica.

Port of Halmstad is a major automotive import port of Sweden. The port has weather protected parking and typically imports more than 100'000 vehicles per annum.

== Expansion ==
The Port of Halmstad is undergoing a major refurbishment and expansion during 2022 - 2026. Total investment, estimated at SEK 700 million, includes a new quay, new breakwaters, a deeper harbor basin, new terminals as well as new rail and road connections. Terminal operators are also expanding, e.g. Schéle is building a new steel center.

== See also ==
- List of busiest ports in Europe
- Port of Gothenburg
