= Norre Port =

Coordinates: 56.67744°N 12.85929°E

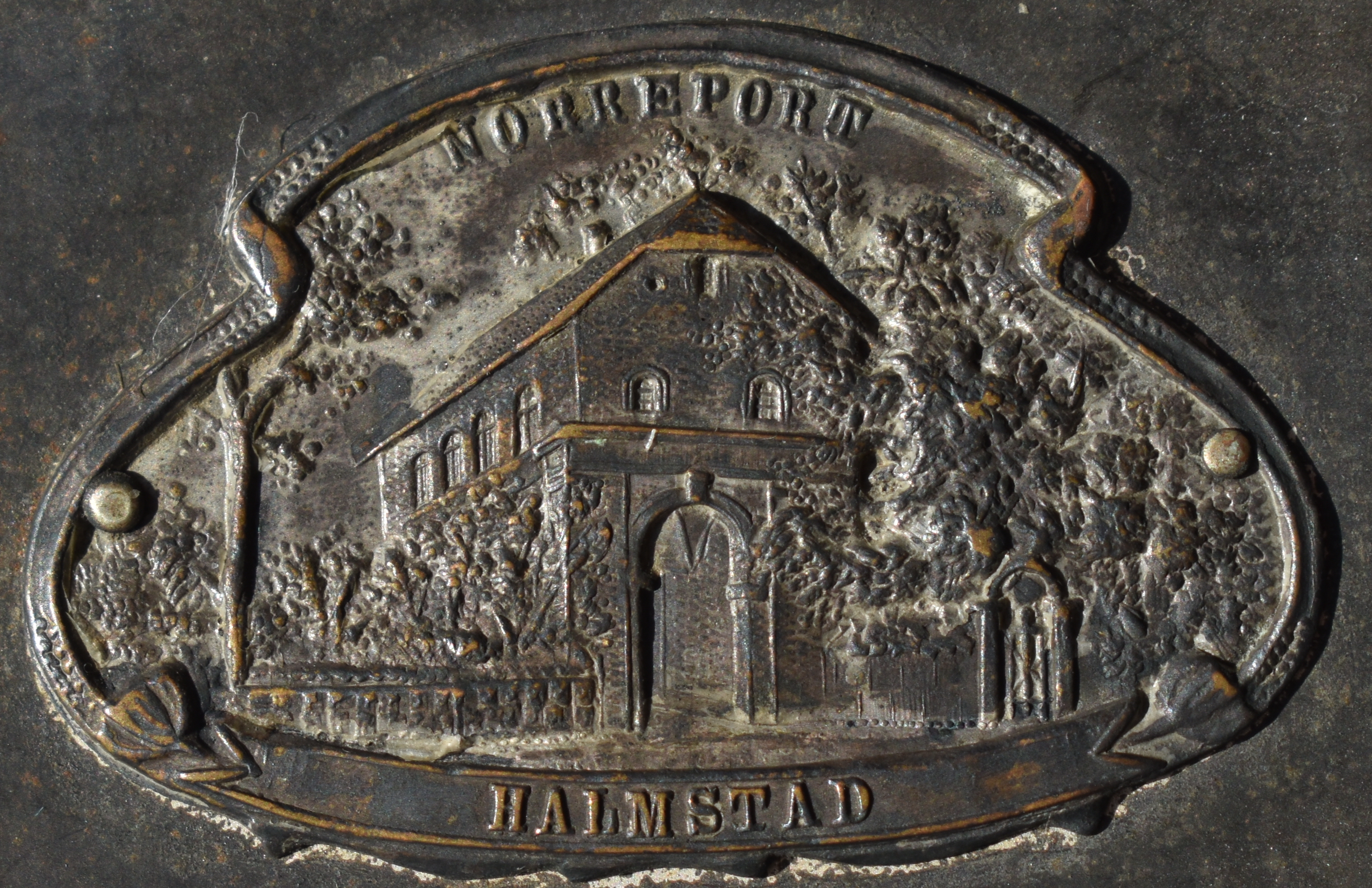
Halmstad Norreport gate on artistic match case from 1800's

Norre Port, also Norreport, city gate in Halmstad, Halland County, Sweden. Norre Port was completed in 1601 under the Danish king Christian IV. This was part of the city's fortifications, which also included Halmstad Castle and the ramparts you can see remnants of in Norre Katt's park and by Charles XI's road. The gate, which leads to the street called Storgatan, is angled in relation to this, a way to prevent shelling towards the city.

== Modern times ==
At the end of the 1870s, Halmstad City Council wanted to demolish Norre Port; it was then in poor condition and was considered an obstacle to traffic and the city's development. The then National Antiquarian Hans Hildebrand however, summarily rejected the City Council's request. Storgatan, now a pedestrian street, was until 1958 part of the Rikstvåan, which passed through Norre Port and Stora Torg, vis Österbro to reach Laholmsvägen. In 1929, Norre Port was provided with light signals that allowed traffic through in alternate directions; Halmstad's first traffic signals. Highway 2 passed through Norre Port until 1960. After the road was re-routed, the gate was closed to car traffic.

At the northern entrance to Halmstad is the so-called Karl XI:s cottage There, the king had to seek shelter one night on his way to Halmstad Castle, when the gate according to current rules was not opened after closing time. Norre Port, which is one of Sweden's few preserved city gates, underwent a renovation in 2005. In June 2007, Norre Port was declared a building monument. For a period, a gallery was housed in Norre Port - Gallery Norre Port.

== Gallery ==
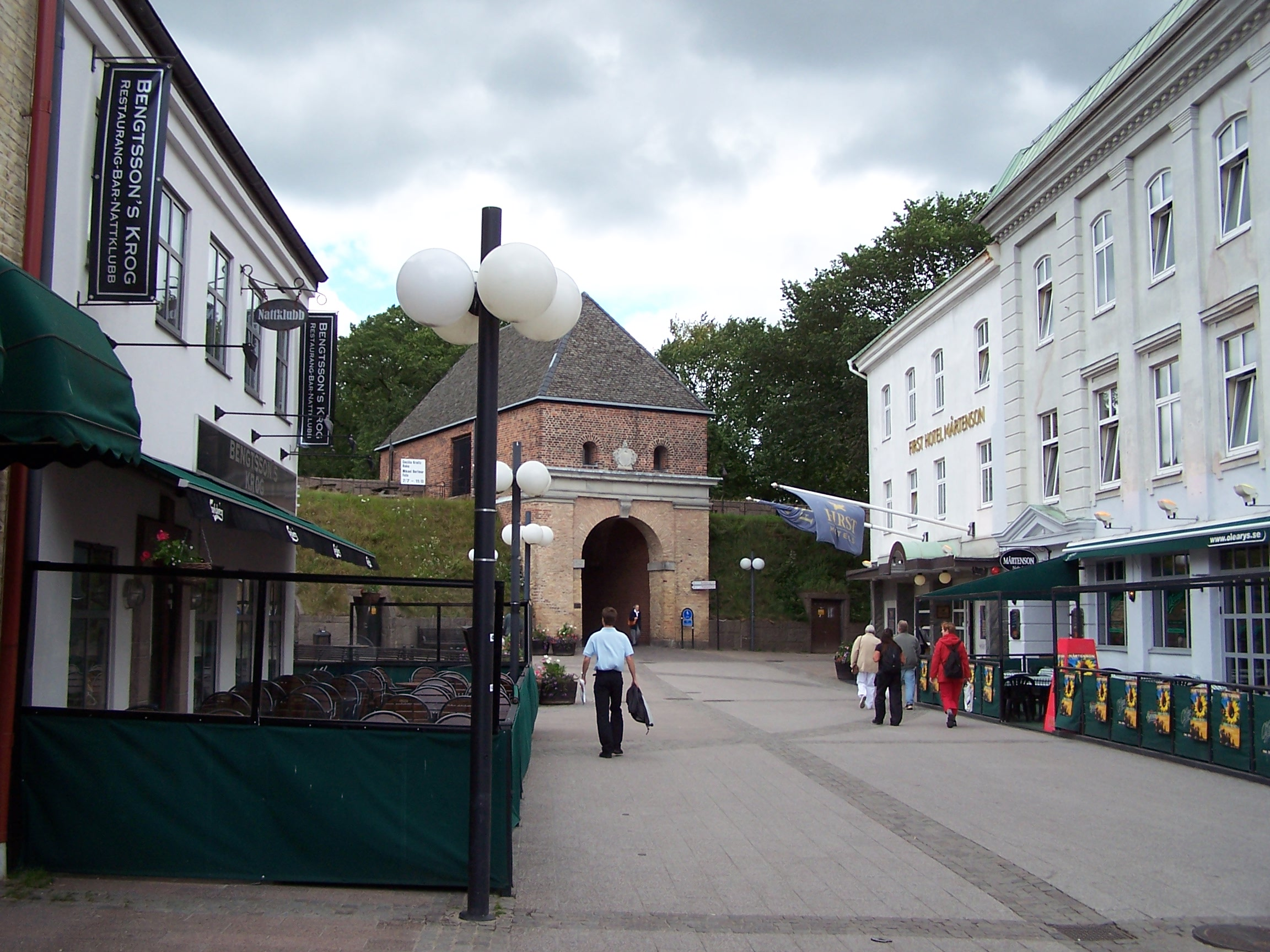
Norre Port seen from Storgatan.

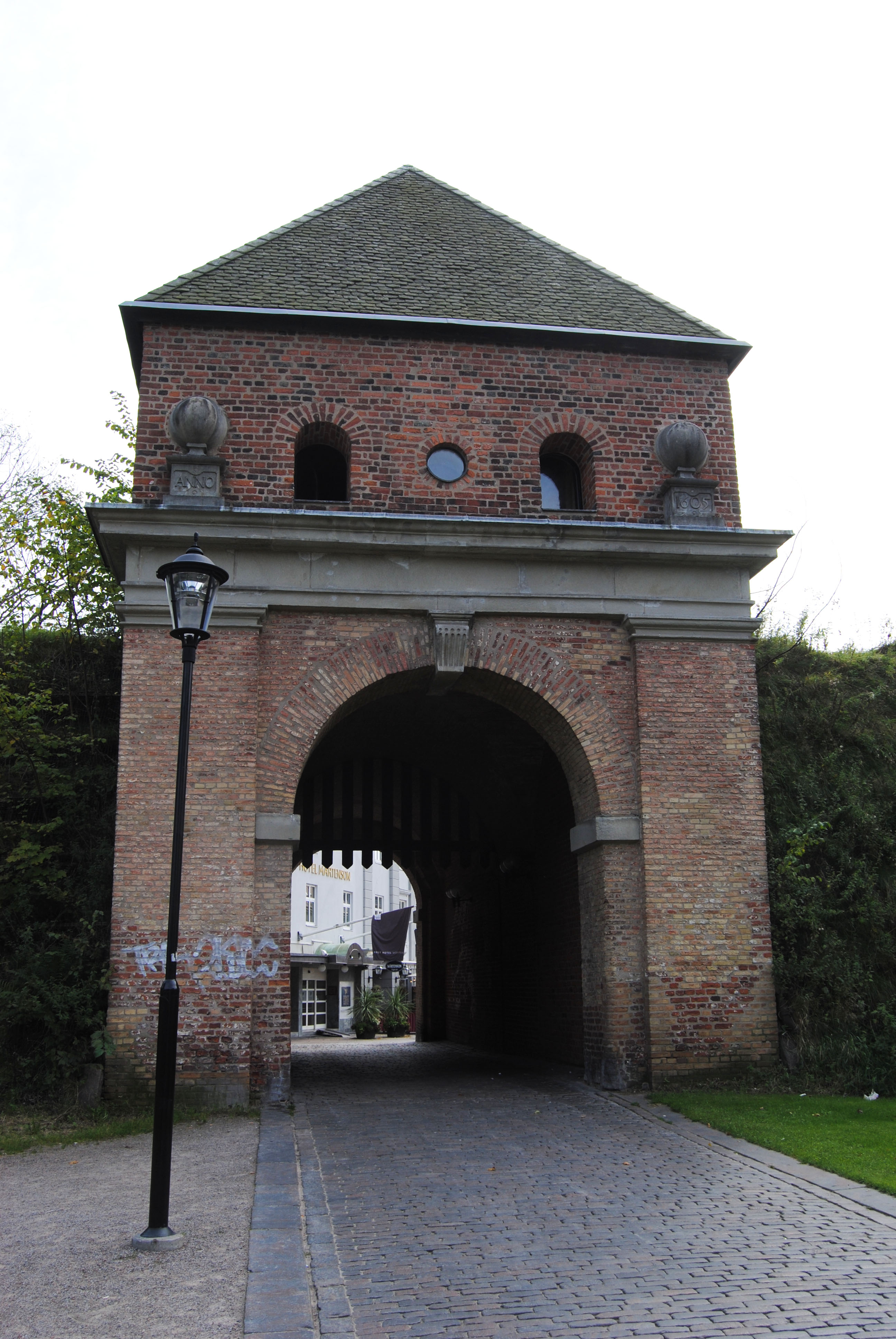
View through the Norre Port

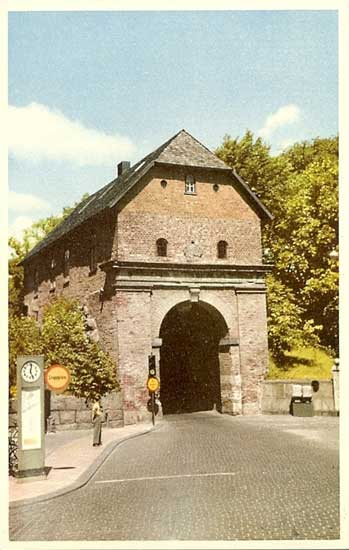
Norre Port from postcard, 1952

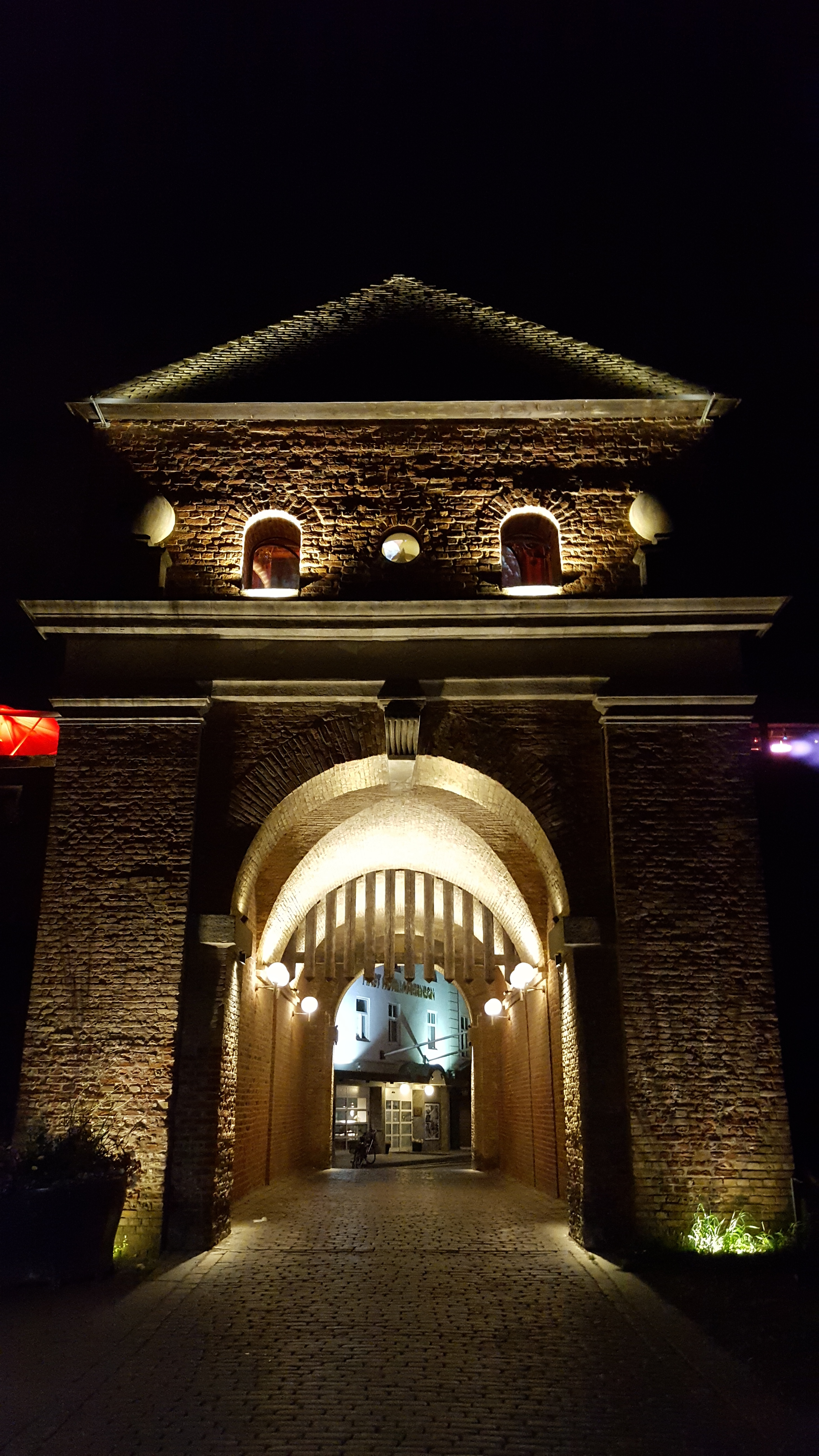
Norre Port Illuminated by night

== Sources ==
- Erik Hägge. 1981. Norre Port Rediviva i krig och fred. Föreningen Gamla Halmstad ISBN 91-7260-565-0
- Swedish language page at Wikipedia (most of the content above, except the match case)
- Match case brought to America in 1891 by Swante Martin (private collection)
