= Krönleins =

Swedish brewery

Krönleins Brewery (Appeltofftska Bryggeri AB) is a Swedish brewery founded in 1836 by Anders Julius Appeltofft in Halmstad, Sweden.

== History ==
Krönleins Brewery was founded on February 15, 1836 when grocery businessman Anders Julius Appeltofft bought an old half-timbered hospital, or "curhuset", at Stora Torg in Halmstad, Sweden, and converted it into an office and a bar. The beer was brewed in the building next door. For the first ten years he made Svensköl, a traditional sweet low-alcohol Swedish beer.

The brewing originally done by Krönleins was done manually. In 1849, a new ground was purchased, situated a couple of hundred meters from the brewery. On the new ground there was an old bastion from the early 17th century, placed next to the old moat. The purpose of the bastion was to protect the town from enemies from the west - hence the name "Wester Katt". An ice cellar was built on the property. A malting for the production of malt was also built on the property. Below the bastion was a well with spring water, where many citizens in Halmstad fetched their water. The water was of very high quality. It is from this well that Krönleins has taken its water since the start in 1836.

=== Munich beer ===
Munich beer was first introduced by Frederik Rosenquist in Sweden in 1843. His brewery was called "The German Brewery" and was situated in Stockholm. The introduction of the Munich beer was greatly helped by, for the time, modern marketing methods and the fact that the Swedish Royal Court became one of the company's biggest customers. The Queen's mother, of German heritage, had until 1843 bought her beer from Germany. The new locally produced German beer became her new supply. After only ten years Munich beer was the most popular beer in Sweden. Beer in Sweden has fought a hard battle with aquavit since medieval times. The brewers had a monopoly of the very profitable aquavit production and were not too interested in selling beer of high quality. This trend was broken with Munich beer.

There are conflicting sources of information as to when Appeltofft started to brew Munich beer. According to one source it was brewed from the start, but that is not very likely given the above information about the introduction in 1843. Another source says it was in the 1850s but most likely it must have been in the late 1840s. Munich beer requires longer storage time than "svensköl" and we know that Krönleins had the possibility to store Munich beer in the ice cellar that was built in 1849. The fact is that the cellar was probably built for this purpose. In any case, Krönleins was well ahead in this respect compared to many other Swedish breweries. The local competitor "Östra Bryggeriet" did not start brewing Munich beer until 1863.

=== The Brewery into Ltd Co ===

The founder Anders Julius Appeltofft died in 1851 of pneumonia - caught on a cold September night at a local restaurant. His widow ran the business until 1855 when their son Per Gustav Appeltofft took over, being the oldest of 8 brothers and sisters. Krönleins was by now in need of capital so the brewery was transformed into a joint stock company in 1861, which is one of the dates that can be seen on the facade of the brew house. The same year it is noted that the staff consisted of one brewer, one book-keeper, one cellar maid, nine brewers- and two stable boys as well as two more boys for janitorial duties. The company board determined in 1867 that the cost of the water transportation by horse carriage could be lowered by building a pipeline from the well to the brewery. The project developed into Halmstad's first permanent pipeline with many subscribers to get water. The brewery also made an agreement with the fire department to always have the water reservoir filled with water in the event of fires. This was in 1870 – 15 years before the city itself offered such service.

=== Pilsner beer ===

When pilsner beer was first brewed in Sweden in the 1870s, the market consisted of Munich beer that dominated the market, and a new kind of bottom-fermented beer called "Swedish lager". The original pilsner came from the city of Plzeň in the present Czech Republic where it had been brewed for a couple of decades. The pilsner filled a gap in the Swedish beer market. Pilsner was easy to drink, less sweet with a notable hop-bitterness and lighter in color than other beers.

=== Move ===
In 1897, the company decided to move the business from Stora Torg to its present premises on "Wester katt". A new house for brewing and malting was built in 1897–1898, and it is still in use today. Apart from the brewhouse another building was built to house a fermentation basement and a cool ship. Electricity and steam were introduced industrializing the brewing process. In 1905 an electrical cooling machine was acquired which industrialized the cooling of the wort and the fermenting of the beer. Before the cooling machine was put into operation ice from frozen lakes was utilized for cooling.

=== New owner ===
In 1920 Anders Krönlein took over the stock majority of the company, effectively becoming the new owner. Extensive modernizations of the brewing process were made. New open fermentation tanks were purchased. They were made of aluminium and now there was no need to take out the wooden vats once a year to rosin them, which cost time and effort. The open fermentation tanks are still in use. During the 1920s and 1930s machines gradually took over hard manual work like tapping, corking and labelling.

During the 1930s and 1940s only beer of 2.8% alcohol by volume had been brewed - pilsner. Krönleins was the first to produce a high grade strong beer in the beginning of the 1950s. The beer was given the name Three Hearts Export. The strong beer was made solely for export, since beer of this strength was prohibited in Sweden at the time.

=== Bottle caps became lucky-buttons in Africa ===
Three Hearts Export was shipped by ocean and exported all the way to the United States with a shipping company called Broströms Tenderservice. Krönlein also managed to sell his beer to Africa. The natives of Côte d'Ivoire became delighted with the bottle caps with the three hearts printed on them and sewed them onto their clothes as lucky buttons. The buttons were believed to protect from evil spirits. The selling of strong beer became allowed in Sweden in 1955 and Three Hearts Export was soon one of the most sold brands of strong beers. Today Three Hearts Export is still around with almost the same styling of the bottle.

Shortly before the next achievement, Anders Krönlein handed over to his son Hans. Hans Krönlein had studied at the most famous brewing school in Weihenstephan, Germany and holds a Diploma in Brewing. He first started as brewer in 1952 and fully succeeded his father in 1960.

The next success came in 1965 when the so-called "mellanöl", or medium alcohol beer, was introduced in Sweden. The beer contained less alcohol than strong beer and could be sold outside the government controlled retail chain Systembolaget. Krönleins had a best seller with a medium strong beer called Three Hearts Middle Beer. Structural changes were made in the beer industry, which also affected Halmstad's two breweries. The competitor Östra Bryggeriet was bought by Krönleins in 1979. The same year Krönleins also stopped producing their own malt.

Hans Krönlein was the head of the company until 1991 when his two sons Carl and Tage took over. Hans remains as head of the board. Before Hans Krönlein handed over the business he developed a beer that won first prize in the Brewing Industry International Awards 1990 for Lager type beer. The beer was called Crocodile Export Lager and was a success in the Swedish market.

=== Krönleins today ===
The Krönlein family has had total ownership over the company since the 1920s.

== Products ==
The company produces a range of beers, ciders, spirits, soft drinks and water. They specialise in adding flavourings to vodka, beer, cider, etc.

The cider brand is Halmstad which is produced in approx 10 different flavours including Wildberry, Dry Lime and Apple. The main soft drinks brand name is Three Hearts, a brand name which is also used for a range of beers and some bottled water. The main brand name for the water is Aqua Cristall.

=== Beer ===
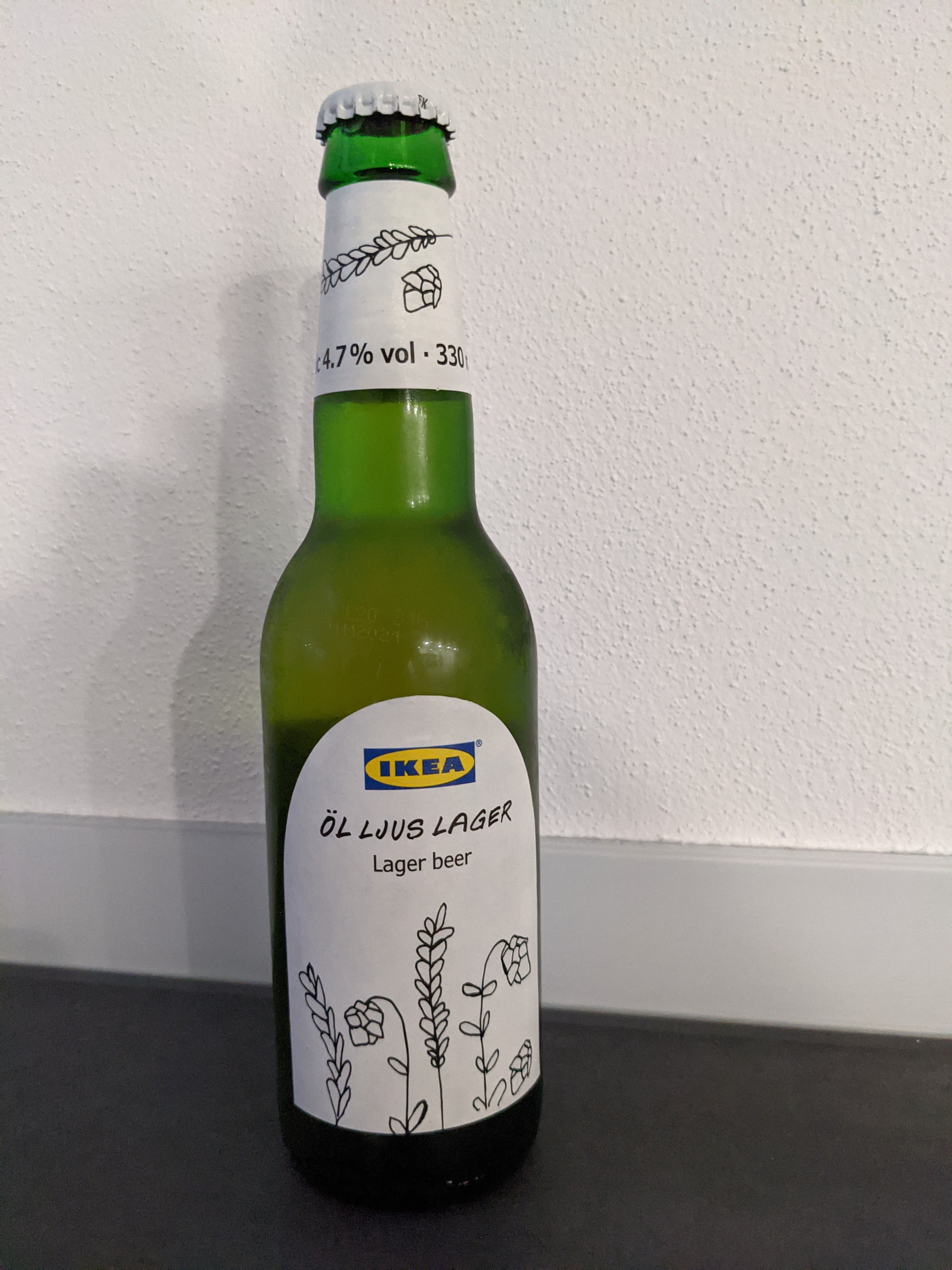
IKEA Öl Ljus Lager, brewed by Krönleins

In addition to the Three Hearts brand the company produces:

- Borg Viking Beer
- Crocodile
- IKEA Öl Ljus Lager
- IKEA Öl Mörk Lager
- K's Blåa
- K's Gröna
- Kaltenberg
- Kaltenberg Oktoberfest
- King Lion
- Kiss Destroyer
- König Ludwig Dunkel
- Liten Ljus Lager
- Skåne Guld
- Stockholm Fine Festival Beer
- Weihenstephan Weissbier

=== Spirits ===
- Znaps Black Jack Vodka
- Znaps Lemon Lime Vodka
- Znaps Vanilla Vodka
- Znaps Blackcurrant Vodka
- Znaps Blackthorn Vodka
- Znaps Elder Vodka
- Znaps Roses Vodka
- Znaps Wild Strawberry Vodka
- Znaps Apple Vodka
- Hart Brothers Blended Whisky
- Hart Brothers The Macallan 12 years Whisky

=== Export ===
Today Krönleins is exporting to many countries; they are also well represented in Germany's big beer market.

Krönleins now exports Stockholm Fine Festival (also known as: Stockholm Premium Lager) to the United States of America
