= Halmstad =

Place in Halland, Sweden

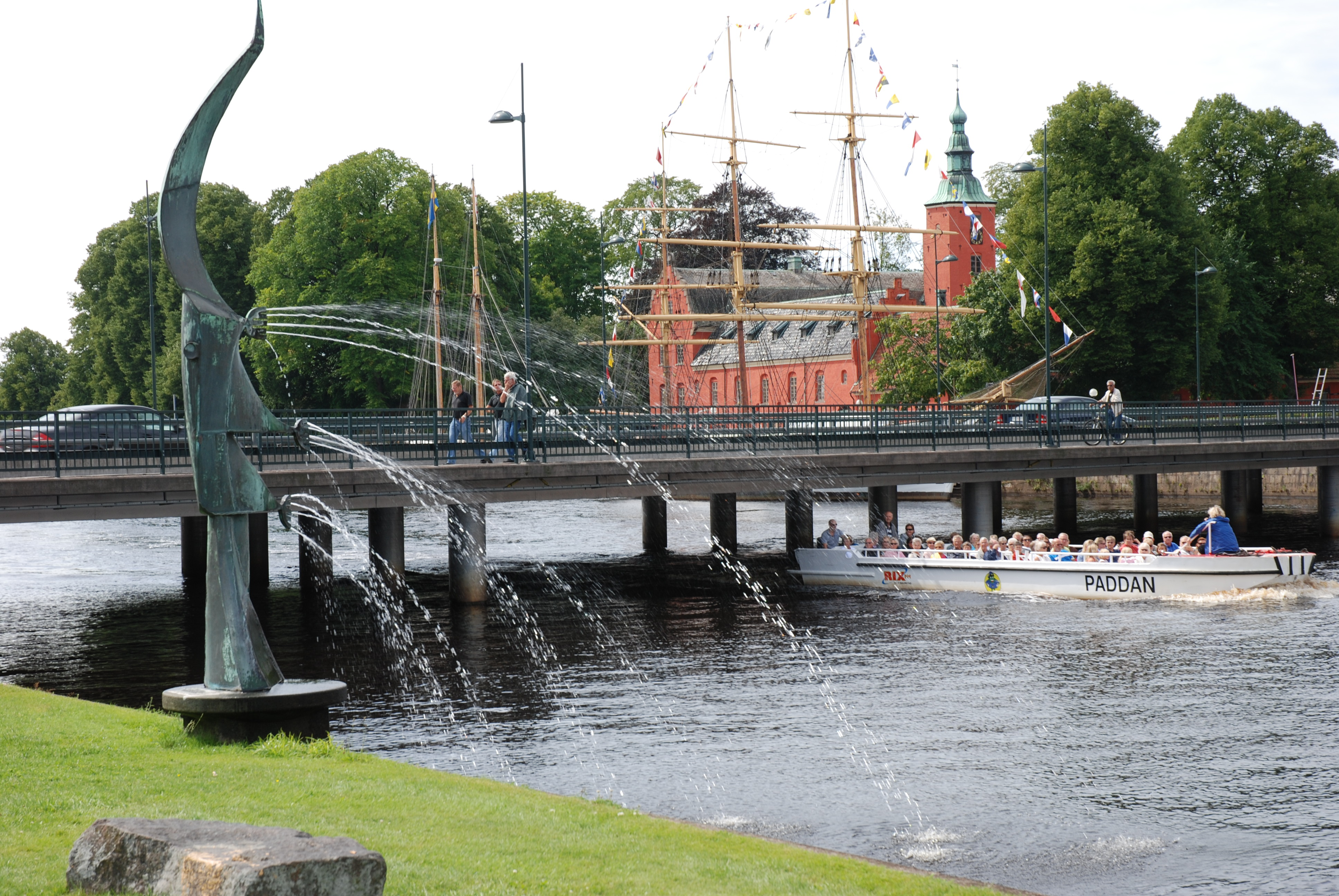
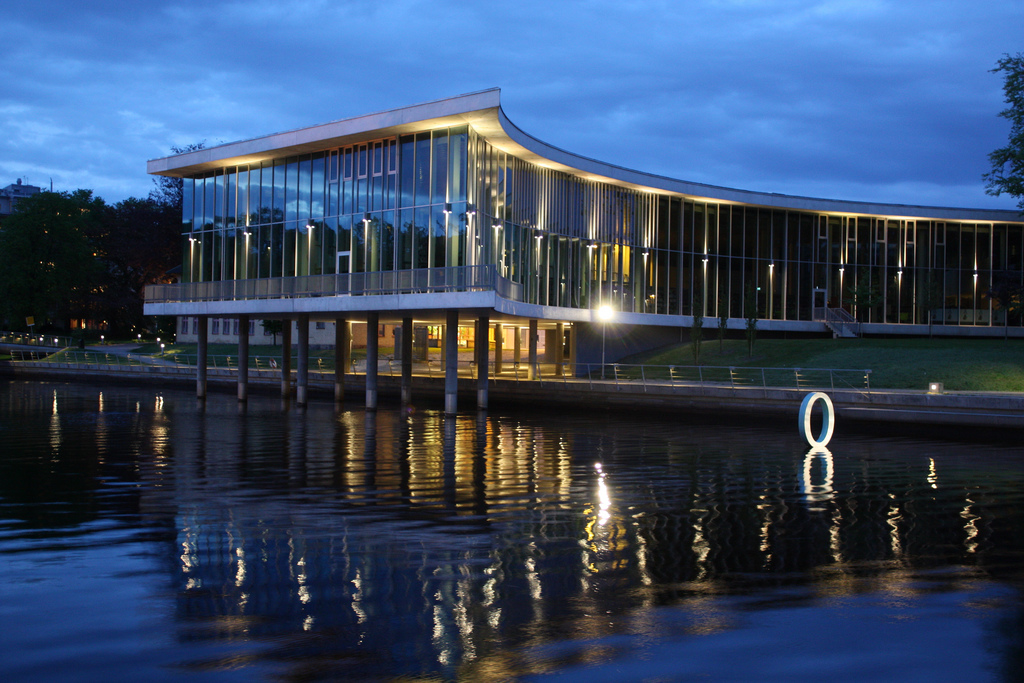
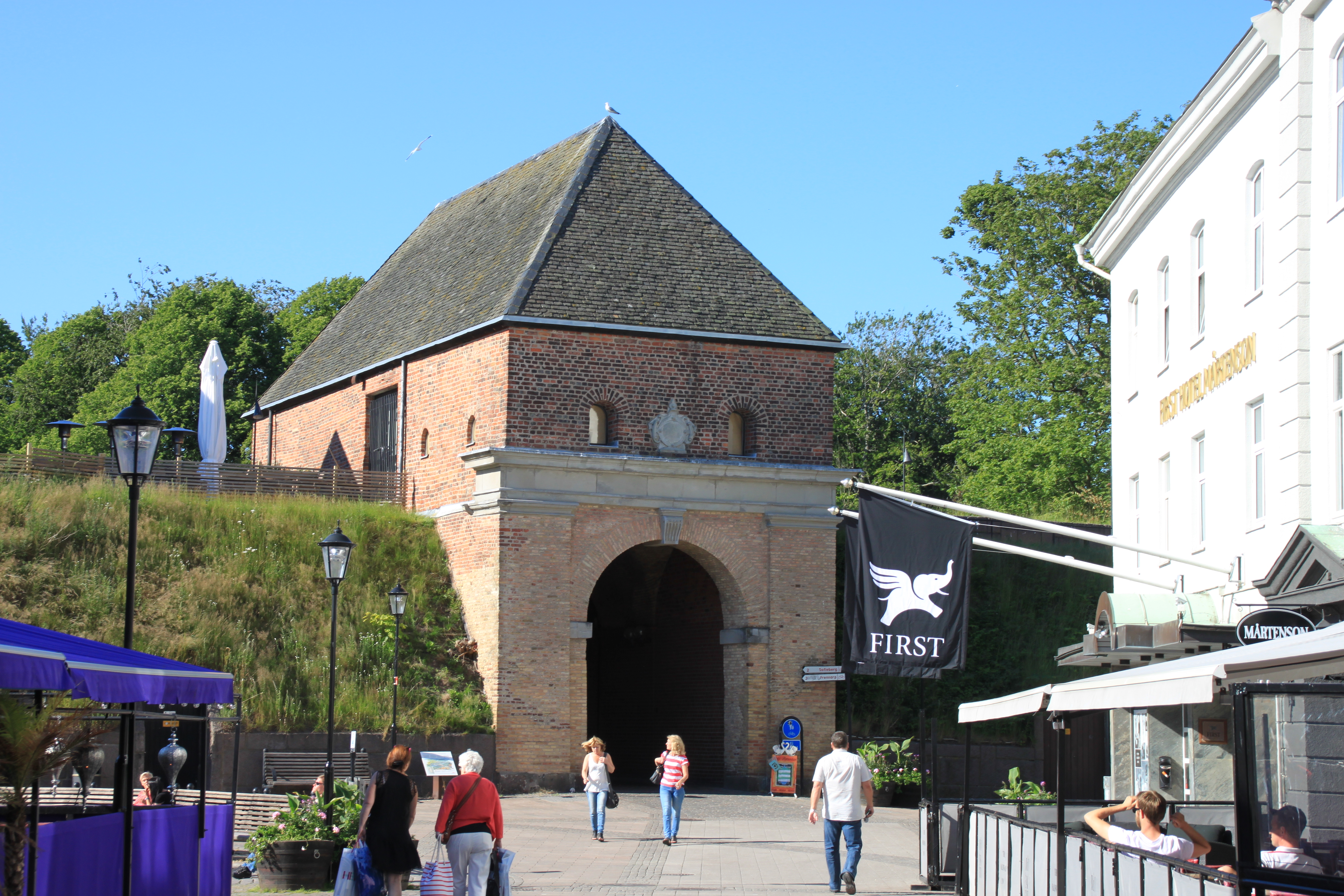

- Coat of arms

- Location within Halland Location within Sweden
- Coordinates: 56°40′26″N 12°51′26″E
- Country: Sweden
- Province: Halland
- County: Halland County
- Municipality: Halmstad Municipality

Area
  - Total: 37.99 km^{2} (14.67 sq mi)
- Elevation: 11 m (36 ft)

Population (31 December 2020)
  - Total: 71,422
  - Density: 1,880/km^{2} (4,869/sq mi)
- Time zone: UTC+1 (CET)
  - Summer (DST): UTC+2 (CEST)
- Postal code: 30x xx
- Area code: (+46) 35
- Website: www.halmstad.se

Halmstad (Swedish: [ˈhǎlmsta(d)]) is a port, university, industrial and recreational city at the mouth of the Nissan river, in the province of Halland on the Swedish west coast. Halmstad is the seat of Halmstad Municipality and the capital of Halland County. The city had a population of 71,422 in 2020, out of a municipal total of over 100,000. Halmstad is Sweden's 19th-largest city by population and located about midway between Gothenburg (the second most populous) and Malmö (the third).

== History ==
Halmstad, at the time part of the Kingdom of Denmark, received its first city charter in 1307, and the city celebrated its 700th anniversary in 2007. The oldest remains of that first town are to be found at "Övraby" upstream on Nissan, just south of and quite close to the present day regiment buildings. The remains of the church can still be seen today between a defunct brick industry and a former landfill.

In the 1320s the town moved to the present day town centre. At this time there were two monasteries in the town and during the 15th century the St. Nikolai church was built. Halland was the object of numerous battles, sieges and occupations by Swedish troops.

During the Kalmar Union, a Nordic Union between Sweden, Norway and Denmark which lasted between 1397 and 1523, it was in Halmstad that the Union King was to be finally selected.

At the end of the 16th century Christian IV of Denmark ordered the fortification of Halmstad and in the beginning of the 17th century to build a crescent-shaped fort with Nissan as part of the defences.

1619 is an important date in the history of Halmstad. In March of that year, King Gustav II Adolf of Sweden and Christian IV met at the castle. Over a period of a week they celebrated the payment in full of the Älvsborg ransom. August of the same year saw the destruction of Halmstad by fire.

Halland became part of Sweden for a period of thirty years when peace was declared at the Treaty of Brömsebro in 1645 and Danish rule ended. The Treaty of Roskilde in 1658 made this acquisition permanent. Sweden defeated Denmark in the Battle of Fyllebro which took place in 1676 just outside Halmstad. In 1678, a parliamentary meeting (Riksdag) was held in Halmstad.

The Riksdag decided in 1734 that the city's fortifications would be demolished. Some residues of fortifications have been preserved, including one of the four city gates, Norre Port. For a period, the old fortifications were used for tobacco cultivation.

The city's first major industry, Wallbergs Factory AB was built in 1823. The brewery Appeltofftska (now Krönleins) was founded in 1836 and brewery Östra Bryggeriet in 1846. AB Malcus Holmquist, also called Malcus, was formed in 1902. Nordiskafilt AB started in 1904 and Halmstads Järnverk in 1916. Lundgren's foundry started in 1917 and Waco in 1918.

A large rebuilding of Halmstad's port was conducted in 1837–1840. The Halländska steamship company was formed in Halmstad in 1850 and started traffic between Gothenburg and Copenhagen, which was soon expanded with several connections. The first railway line, Halmstad—Värnamo, opened in 1877.

Halmstad was continually industrialized at the end of the 19th century. The city grew from 12,000 to 15,000 inhabitants during the 1890s. Every year, 1,000 people moved to Halmstad and 800—900 moved away.

Halmstad's first union was formed in 1885 by tailor workers.

After expanding in 1967, Halmstad become central town in 1971 in Halmstad's municipality. The population grew from 48,800 in 1990 to 58,577 in 2010.

== Climate ==
Halmstad has the south Scandinavian climate of a relatively rainy environment with warm summers and winters around the freezing point. The local climate is defined as an oceanic climate (Cfb) with some continental influence.

Climate data for Halmstad (2002–2022 averages); extremes since 1901
Month	Jan	Feb	Mar	Apr	May	Jun	Jul	Aug	Sep	Oct	Nov	Dec	Year
Record high °C (°F)	10.2 (50.4)	13.2 (55.8)	19.3 (66.7)	28.1 (82.6)	30.0 (86.0)	34.2 (93.6)	34.0 (93.2)	33.0 (91.4)	29.5 (85.1)	22.6 (72.7)	16.0 (60.8)	11.4 (52.5)	34.2 (93.6)
Mean maximum °C (°F)	6.9 (44.4)	8.2 (46.8)	13.5 (56.3)	20.1 (68.2)	25.6 (78.1)	28.1 (82.6)	29.8 (85.6)	28.3 (82.9)	23.4 (74.1)	16.9 (62.4)	12.0 (53.6)	8.4 (47.1)	30.5 (86.9)
Mean daily maximum °C (°F)	2.5 (36.5)	3.0 (37.4)	6.5 (43.7)	12.5 (54.5)	17.4 (63.3)	20.9 (69.6)	22.7 (72.9)	21.9 (71.4)	17.8 (64.0)	12.0 (53.6)	7.5 (45.5)	4.1 (39.4)	12.4 (54.3)
Daily mean °C (°F)	0.3 (32.5)	0.5 (32.9)	2.9 (37.2)	7.5 (45.5)	12.3 (54.1)	15.9 (60.6)	18.0 (64.4)	17.5 (63.5)	13.8 (56.8)	8.9 (48.0)	5.3 (41.5)	1.9 (35.4)	8.7 (47.7)
Mean daily minimum °C (°F)	−2 (28)	−2 (28)	−0.7 (30.7)	2.4 (36.3)	7.2 (45.0)	10.9 (51.6)	13.3 (55.9)	13.1 (55.6)	9.9 (49.8)	5.8 (42.4)	3.0 (37.4)	−0.3 (31.5)	5.1 (41.0)
Mean minimum °C (°F)	−12.1 (10.2)	−9.9 (14.2)	−8 (18)	−4.1 (24.6)	−0.1 (31.8)	5.2 (41.4)	8.1 (46.6)	7.4 (45.3)	2.2 (36.0)	−2.8 (27.0)	−5.9 (21.4)	−9.2 (15.4)	−14.7 (5.5)
Record low °C (°F)	−26.2 (−15.2)	−25.7 (−14.3)	−23 (−9)	−10.7 (12.7)	−4.4 (24.1)	0.2 (32.4)	1.7 (35.1)	2.0 (35.6)	−4.8 (23.4)	−9.6 (14.7)	−18 (0)	−23.2 (−9.8)	−26.2 (−15.2)
Average precipitation mm (inches)	64.1 (2.52)	52.9 (2.08)	40.9 (1.61)	39.7 (1.56)	56.4 (2.22)	81.4 (3.20)	97.8 (3.85)	112.9 (4.44)	74.2 (2.92)	92.2 (3.63)	68.9 (2.71)	75.0 (2.95)	856.4 (33.69)
Source 1: SMHI Open Data
Source 2: SMHI Monthly Data 2002–2022

== Education ==
=== Primary education ===
Some of these schools might also have secondary education

- Brunnsåkersskolan
- Centrumskolan
- Frennarps Byskola
- Furulundsskolan
- Linehedsskolan
- Nyhemsskolan
- Slottsjordsskolan
- Bäckagårdsskolan
- Sofiebergsskolan
- Stenstorpsskolan
- Östergårdsskolan
- Fyllingeskolan

=== Secondary education ===
- Kattegattgymnasiet
- Sturegymnasiet
- Sannarpsgymnasiet

=== Tertiary education ===
Founded in 1983, Halmstad University is a public higher education institution offering bachelor's and master's programs in various fields of study. In addition, it conducts Ph.D. programs in three fields of research: Information Technology, Innovation Science and Health Science. Halmstad University has more than 9 000 students, including 245 exchange students (2013) and 163 international programme students (2013).

== Transportation ==
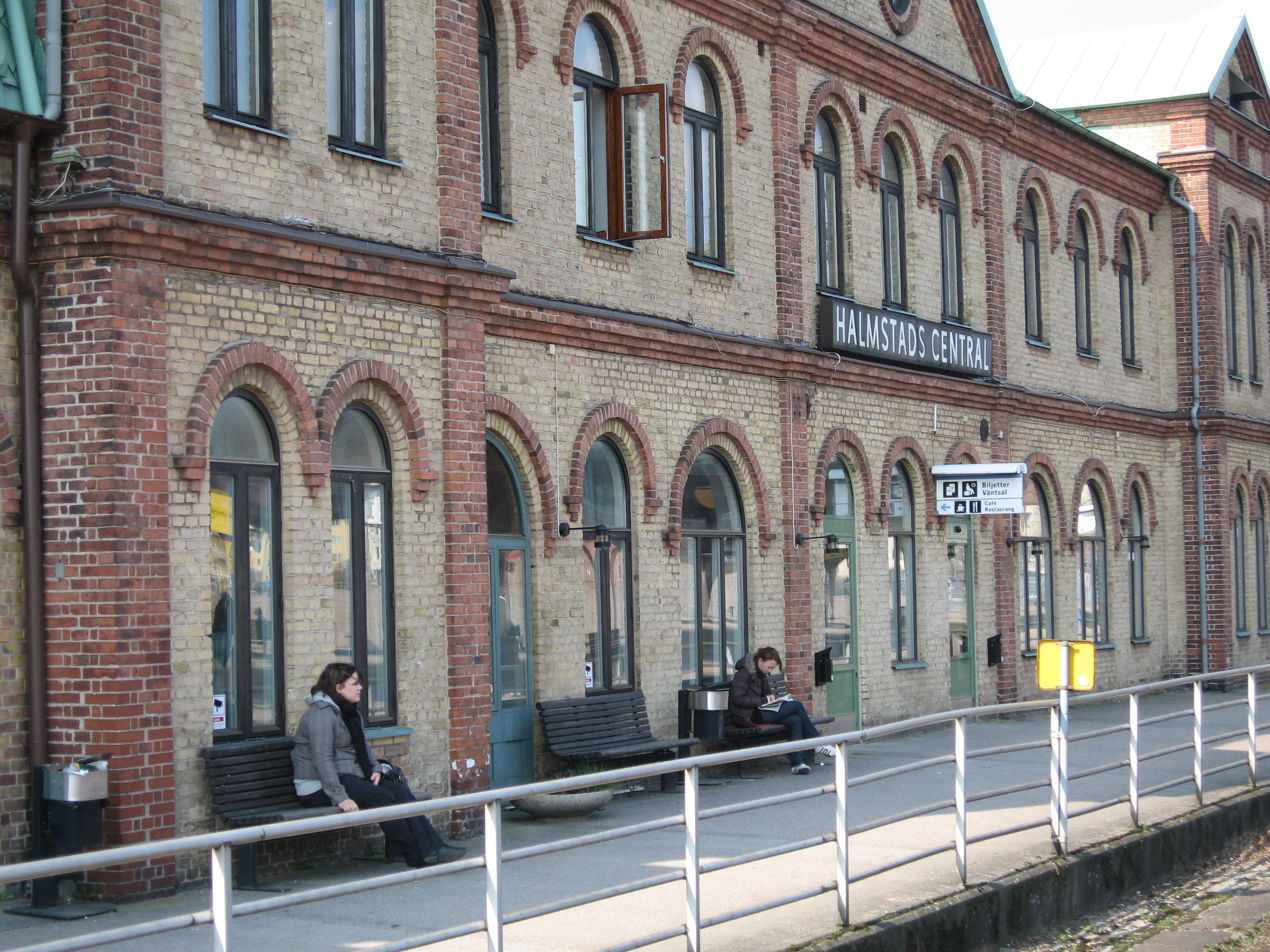
Halmstad Central railway station

Halmstad is located along the West Coast Line and at the beginning of the Halmstad-Nässjö railway line. Regional trains are operated under the brands Øresundståg to Gothenburg and Copenhagen, Pågatågen to Helsingborg and Krösatågen to Nässjö and Jönköping. State operator SJ operates high-speed trains to Gothenburg, Malmö and Stockholm, with private operator MTRX operating additional trains to Stockholm in the summer.

Halmstad is the starting point for national roads 25 and 26, and is situated along the E6/E20 motorways.

Halmstad Airport is a minor international airport with direct flights to various destinations in Europe. Port of Halmstad is one of Sweden's 10 largest seaports.

== Sport ==
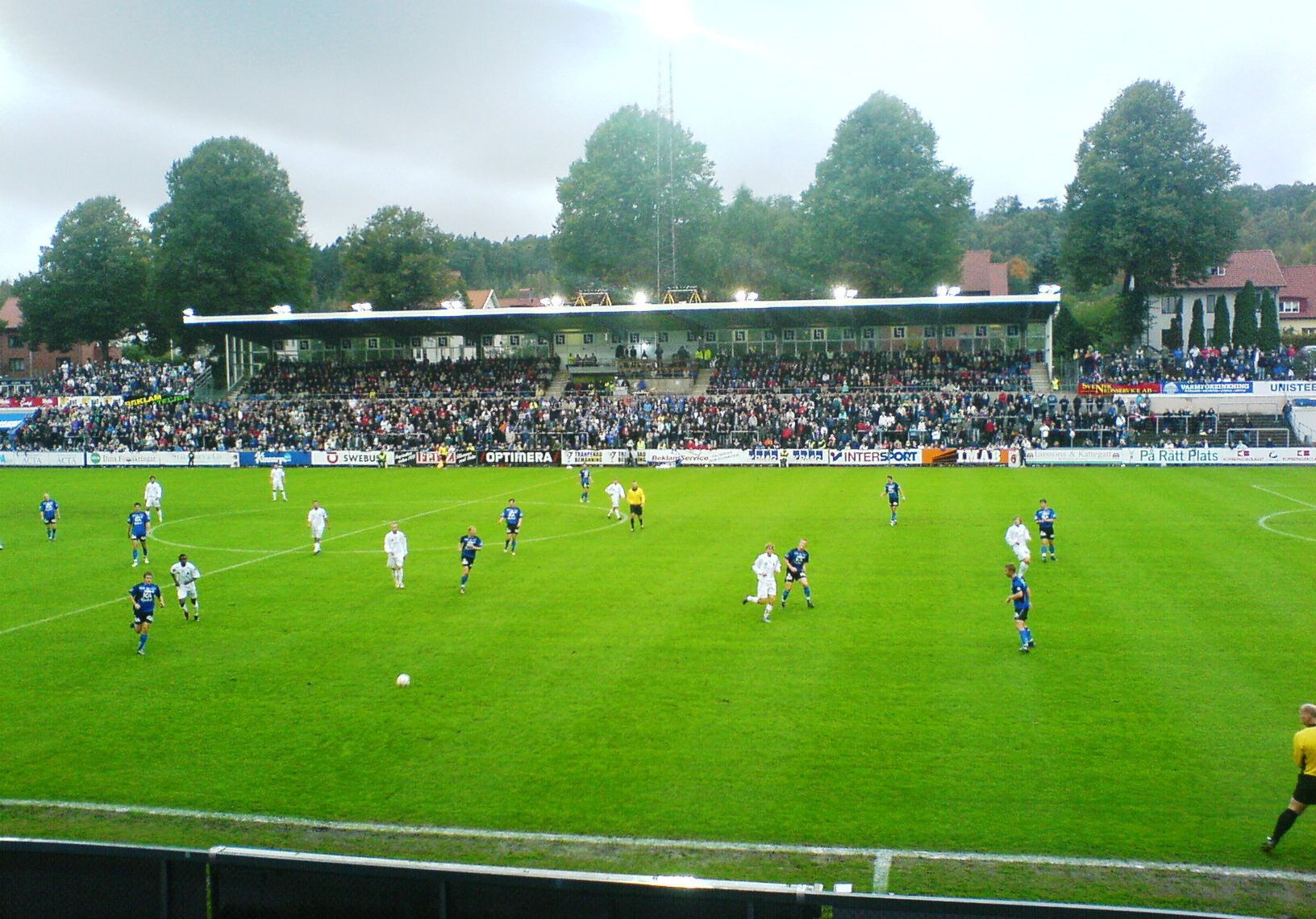
Halmstads BK versus Gefle IF at Örjans Vall 2007.

=== Event host ===
In September 2007 the city hosted the Solheim Cup, which was played at the Halmstad Golfklubb. In 2011 Halmstad was the final port of the Tall Ships' Races. Halmstad also hosted the 2018 World Team Table Tennis Championships.

=== Local sportsteams ===
- American Football
  - Halmstad Eagles
- Association football
  - Halmstads BK
  - IS Halmia
  - Alets IK
  - BK Astrio
  - IF Centern
  - IF Leikin
  - Snöstorp/Nyhem FF
  - IS Örnia
- Badminton
  - Halmstad Badmintonklubb
- Bowling
  - BK 91:an Halmstad
  - BK Hallandia
  - BK Nyhem
  - BK Pantern
  - BK Safir
  - BS Tylön
  - Halmia BS
  - IF Tre Hjärtan
  - Team Halmstad BF
- Cricket
  - Halmstad Cricket club
- Dancing
  - Laxbuggarna
- Fencing
  - Halmstads Fäktsällskap
- Figure skating
  - Halmstads konståkningsklubb
- Golf
  - Halmstad GK
  - Bäckavattnets GK
  - Garnisonen GK
  - Holms GK
  - Ringenäs GK
  - Haverdals GK
- Gymnastics
  - Halmstad Frigymnaster
  - Halmstad Kvinnliga GF
  - Halmstad Rytmiska GF
  - Nissaflickorna
- Ice hockey
  - Halmstad Hammers HC
  - Halmstad Ungdom HC
  - Sannarps HC
- Swimming
  - SK Laxen
- Table tennis
  - Halmstad BTK
- Team handball
  - HK Drott
  - Halmstads HP
- Tennis
  - Söndrums TK
- Track & Field
  - IFK Halmstad
- Volleyball
  - Hylte/Halmstad VBK

== Notable residents ==
- Luai Ahmed (born 1993), Yemeni-born Swedish journalist, columnist, and influencer
- Sven Colliander, Lieutenant General and Olympian
- Per Gessle, musician (Gyllene Tider, Roxette)
- Rolf Peterson, canoer

== See also ==
- Krönleins Brewery
- Mjellby Art Museum
- Norreport historic city gate
- Chronicle of the Expulsion of the Grayfriars#Chapter 11 Concerning the Friary in Halmstad
