= Timeline of Alicante =

The following is a timeline of the history of the city of Alicante, Spain.

== Prior to 20th century ==
- 718 – Moors in power.
- 1240 – Valencian moor Zayyan ibn Mardanix became governor (rais) of Laqant, until he departed to exile in 1247.
- 1247 – Castle of Alacant is defended by Valencian moor al-Azraq.
- 1252 – Owned by Alfonso X.
- 1265 – Colonized mainly by Catalan population during an ongoing military campaign led by James I of Aragon. Catalan became traditional language in Alicante since then until nowadays.
- 1296/1304 – Alicante becomes part of the Kingdom of Valencia per Treaty of Torrellas.
- 1331 – Attempted siege of Alicante by Moorish forces.
- 1490 – Given the status of a town by Ferdinand II.
- 1662 – San Nicolás de Bari church built.
- 1709 – Siege of Alicante by French forces.
- 1780 – Alicante City Hall built (approximate date).
- 1785 – Consulado (merchant guild) established.
- 1797 – Population: 20,000.
- 1822 – Diputación Provincial de Alicante (governing body) established.
- 1834 – Alicante Sociedad Económica de los Amigos del País established.
- 1842 – Population: 19,021.
- 1847 – Teatro Principal (Alicante) (theatre) built.
- 1855 – Public library established.
- 1858 – Madrid-Alicante railway begins operating.
- 1860 – Walls of Alicante dismantling begins.
- 1873 – Siege of Alicante (1873) by Federalists of Cartagena.
- 1885 – Murcia-Alicante railway built.
- 1886 – Parque de Canalejas (park) created.
- 1888 – Plaza de toros de Alicante (bullring) built.
- 1900
  - Palacio de Justicia de Alicante (courthouse) built.
  - Population: 50,142.

== 20th century ==
- 1902 – Alicante anthem composed by Juan Latorre Baeza.
- 1906 – Diario de Alicante newspaper begins publication.
- 1913 – El Luchador (Alicante) newspaper begins publication.
- 1919 – Club Natación Alicante (football club) formed.
- 1921 – Mercado Central de Alicante built on Avenida de Alfonso el Sabio.
- 1922 – Hércules CF (football club) active.
- 1924 – Cine Monumental (cinema) built.
- 1925
  - Cementerio de Alicante (cemetery) established.
  - Florida Alta barrio developed.
- 1930
  - Fountain installed in the Plaza de los Luceros.
  - Population: 73,071.
- 1931
  - 12 April: Municipal election held.^{(es)}
  - Palacio Provincial de Alicante built.
- 1932 – Archaeological Museum of Alicante opens.
- 1938 – 25 May: Bombing of Alicante during the Spanish Civil War.
- 1939
  - Campo de concentración de Los Almendros (detention camp) created.
  - 30 March: Italian forces take city from the Republicans.
- 1941 – Diario Información newspaper begins publication.
- 1947 – Banco de España building (Alicante) constructed.
- 1950 – Population: 104,222.
- 1956 – Hospital General Universitario de Alicante built.
- 1959 – Roman Catholic Diocese of Orihuela-Alicante active.
- 1962 – Estudiotel Alicante high-rise built.
- 1963 – El Barco high-rise built in Albufereta barrio.
- 1967 – El Altet Airport opens.
- 1968 – Alicante railway station rebuilt.
- 1971 – Gran Sol hi-rise built on the Rambla de Méndez Núñez.
- 1974
  - Archivo Histórico Provincial de Alicante (archives) established.
  - Estadio José Rico Pérez (stadium) opens.
- 1977 – Alicante Museum of Contemporary Art opens.
- 1979
  - University of Alicante established.
  - Estadio Alicante CF (stadium) opens.
- 1981 – Population: 251,387.
- 1982 – Part of 1982 FIFA World Cup football contest held in Alicante.
- 1983 – Biblioteca Pública Azorín de Alicante (library) active.
- 1985 – Festival de Música Contemporánea de Alicante begins.
- 1993 – Muestra de Teatro Español de Autores Contemporáneos (theatre festival) begins.
- 1999 – Alicante Tram begins operating.

== 21st century ==
- 2001
  - European Union Intellectual Property Office headquartered in Alicante.
  - Gravina Museum of Fine Arts established.
- 2004 – Festival de Cine de Alicante begins.
- 2005 – Film studio Ciudad de la Luz begins operating.
- 2009 – Alicante Innovation and Territory regional development plan published.
- 2011
  - Auditorio de la Diputación de Alicante (concert hall) built.
  - Population: 329,325.
- 2014 – Population: 332,067 city; 757,085 metro.
- 2015 – Gabriel Echávarri becomes mayor.

== See also ==
- History of Alicante
- List of mayors of Alicante

Other cities in the autonomous Valencian Community:^{(es)}

- Timeline of Valencia

== Bibliography ==
=== in English ===
- Josiah Conder (1830), "Alicant", The Modern Traveller, London: J.Duncan
- John Ramsay McCulloch (1880), "Alicante", in Hugh G. Reid (ed.), A Dictionary, Practical, Theoretical and Historical of Commerce and Commercial Navigation, London: Longmans, Green, and Co.
- Richard Ford (1890), "Alicante", Handbook for Travellers in Spain, vol. 2 (7th ed.), London: J. Murray, p. 459
- Richard Stephen Charnock (1894), "Alicante", Bradshaw's Illustrated Hand-book to Spain and Portugal, W.J. Adams & Sons, OCLC 36885426
- "Alicante (capital)" . Encyclopædia Britannica. Vol. 1 (11th ed.). 1910. p. 661.
- "Alicante", Spain and Portugal (4th ed.), Leipzig: Karl Baedeker, 1913, hdl:2027/uc2.ark:/13960/t5q81nw29 – via HathiTrust

=== in Spanish ===
- Vicente Bendicho (1640), Crónica de la muy ilustre noble y leal ciudad de Alicante (in Spanish)
- Pascual Madoz, ed. (1845). "Alicante". Diccionario geográfico-estadístico-histórico de España y sus posesiones de Ultramar (in Spanish). Madrid.
- Historia general de la ciudad y castillo de Alicante (in Spanish). 1854.
- Jose Alfonso Roca de Togores (1883). Guia de Alicante: manual del alicantino y del forastero (in Spanish). Sociedad Economica de Amigos del Pais – via Biblioteca Valenciana Digital.
- Ensayo biografico bibliografico de escritores de Alicante y de su provincia (in Spanish). 1890.
- Guía práctica de Alicante y su provincia (in Spanish). A. Marzo. 1908.
- Francisco Moreno Sáez, ed. (1990), "Historia de la Ciudad de Alicante", Ayuntamiento de Alicante (in Spanish) (4 parts)
