= Lucentum =

Human settlement in Alicante, L'Alacantí, Alicante Province, Spain

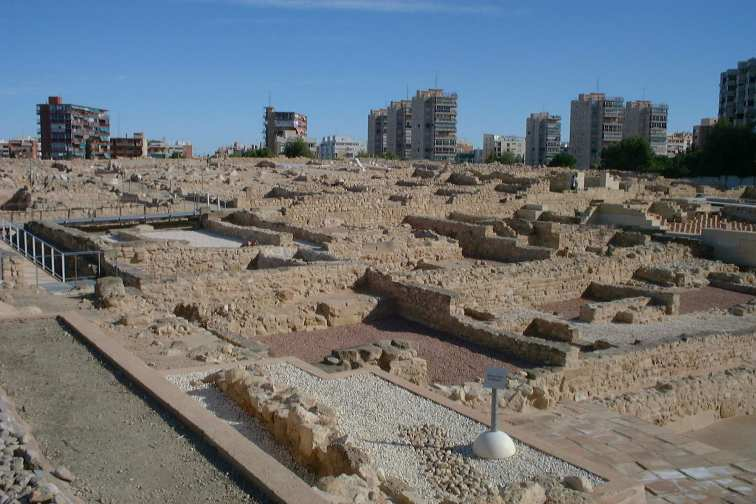
- The archaeological site is surrounded by the buildings of modern Alicante.

- Location within Province of Alicante Location within Valencian Community Location within Spain
- 38°21′52″N 00°26′18″W
- Type: Settlement
- Location: Alicante, Province of Alicante, Valencian Community, Spain

History
- Built: End of the 3rd century BC
- Abandoned: Between the 2nd and 3rd centuries AD

Lucentum (Ancient Greek: Λούκεντον, Loúkenton), called Lucentia by Pomponius Mela, is the Roman predecessor of the city of Alicante, Spain. Particularly, it refers to the archaeological site in which the remains of this ancient settlement lie, at a place known as El Tossal de Manises, in the neighborhood of Albufereta.

== Ancient history ==
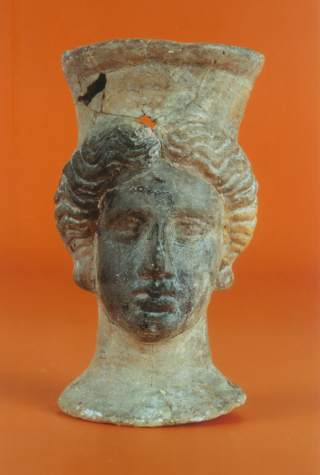
Funerary vase from the necropolis of Lucentum.

Diodorus ascribes Lucentum's foundation to the Carthaginian leader Hamilcar Barcas. As a Mediterranean and Iberian commercial center, it had trading contacts with Greece, Phoenicia, and the southern Iberian city of Tartessos, absorbing some of their influences. This unique mixture gave rise to a culture called Contestani by Pliny the Elder and Strabo. Its ruins include various distinctly Carthaginian features.

The Punic town was known to the Greeks as the "White Promontory" or "White Citadel", variously given as Ákra Leuká (Ancient Greek: Ἄκρα Λευκά), Ákra Leukḗ (Ἄκρα Λευκή), and Leukḕ Ákra' (Λευκὴ Ἄκρα). Livy translated the second sense of the Greek name into Latin, calling the settlement Castrum Album. The Greek probably translated the site's Punic name, although some prefer to imagine it transcribes an Iberian placename involving the words lug ("water") and cant ("cliff").

The city enjoyed its peak between the 1st century BC and the 1st century AD, and the majority of the city's remains bear a Roman stamp. The town was refounded as Lucentum (from Latin lucere, referring to the same geographical feature, the "white promontory") after P. Cornelius Scipio conquered the area in the course of the Second Punic War. Over the years it gained a thoroughly Roman character, complete with baths, forums, temples, sewers, etc. It was one of the major cities of the Roman province of Hispania Tarraconensis.

It entered into a decline in the 2nd century and was effectively abandoned by the end of the 3rd century. The chief cause of this decline was competition from the neighboring city of Ilici (today's Elche), which had better water and land communications and began to usurp Lucentum's trade. Eventually, the settlement was completely depopulated, the site used only for a Muslim cemetery during the 10th and 11th centuries.

== Modern history ==
The first modern evidence concerning the location of the ancient city came in 1780, when the Count of Lumiares, Antonio Valcárcel Pío de Saboya, suggested that the ruins of Tossal de Manises, which he personally had excavated for a number of years, were in fact Lucentum. This contradicted the common wisdom at the time, which held that the Roman city was well outside the town of Alicante. Later, the ruins were excavated by Lafuente and Figueras, who found the more ancient Carthaginian city. In the 1930s they were again excavated by a Professor Belda, around which time a necropolis was discovered during road construction.

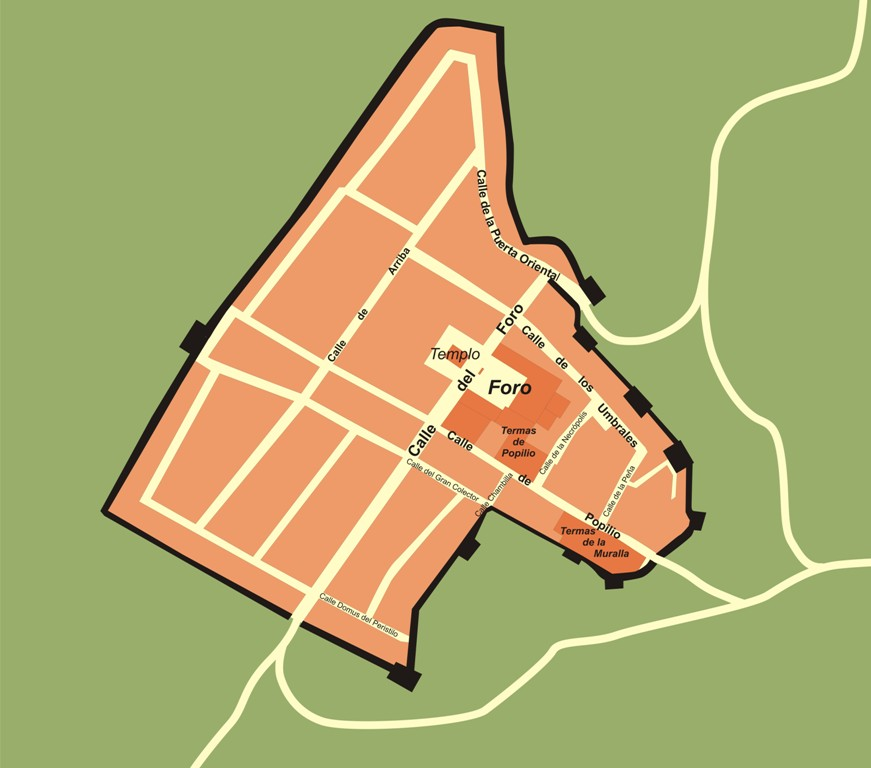
Hypothetical reconstruction of the city plan circa 1st century AD

The site contains evidence of both the Iberian and the Roman epochs, although in terms of material recovered and ruins remaining the Roman influences (especially from the 1st century AD and afterwards) predominate. The Roman city was constructed over the Iberian one, of which practically nothing remains except for the walls. The lower level is contemporary with a necropolis excavated in the 1930s to make way for a road, and whose materials are now housed in the Archaeological Museum of Alicante. Among these, a number of cauldrons stand out as well as Iberian ceramics decorated with geometric shapes, birds, and fish, sculptures, jewelry, amulets of Egyptian origin, terracotta ware, and weapons. Of the jewelry recovered, a type of pendant, possibly for masculine use, is quite notable as it suggests that there was a local workshop whose production made its way into other local burial sites. Finally, the "Kore de Alicante", currently housed in the Archaeological Museum of Catalonia could have come from this site.

In the post-war period, the site (located in a privileged place, with an excellent view of the ancient lagoon and bay) was in danger of disappearing, a victim of real estate speculation. However, efforts by those in favor of its preservation, most notably the Swedish archaeologist Solveig Nordström, succeeded in defending the site. This effort culminated in the 1961 designation as an "Artistic and Historic Monument", which afforded some legal protection. Unfortunately, the preservation movement could not stop much development around the site, with the result that the ruins are surrounded by tall buildings and is in no way "visually pure".

Despite the legal protections which had been won for the ruins, they suffered from neglect and exposure for a number of years, until efforts were finally made in the 1990s to conserve them. This resulted in recent construction, directed by the architect Rafael Pérez Jiménez and the archaeologist Manuel Olcina Doménech, which aims at the definitive and irreversible conservation of what remains of the ruins. Such a recuperation represents a cultural milestone for Alicante.

== Lucentum today ==
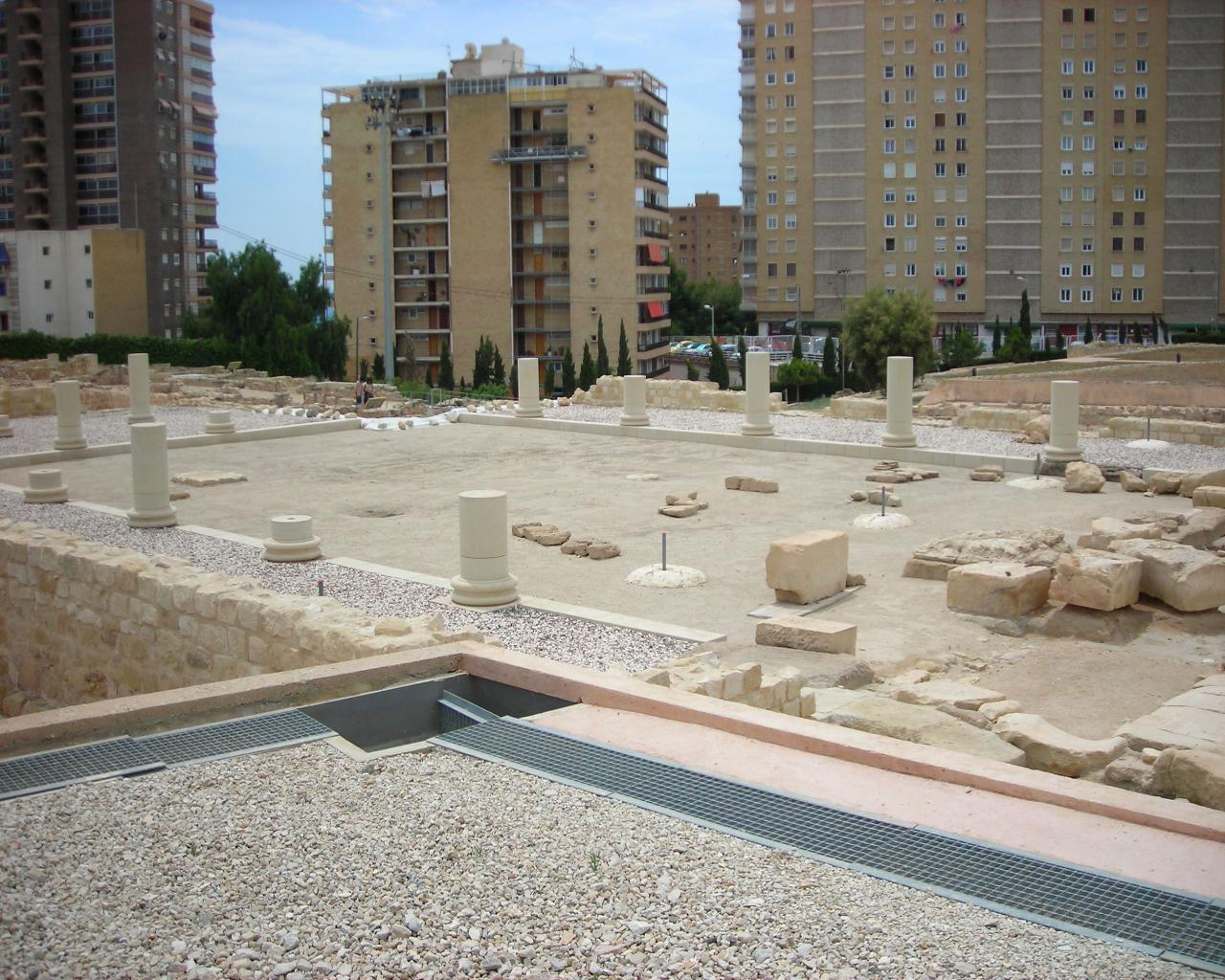
The Roman forum of Lucentum

Currently, one can visit the archaeological site, which covers an area of some 30,000 m^{2} (7.4 acres). The most noticeable features are the remains of the fortifying wall (including the foundations of the pre-Roman defensive towers), the baths, the forum, part of the Muslim necropolis, and a multitude of houses. In addition, a part of the Tossal de Manisses is currently being excavated, which it is hoped will increase the size and importance of the site.

The influence of Lucentum is also present in the culture of the area, with many businesses, associations, and sports clubs in the Alicante area bearing the name of the ancient city.

== See also ==
- Roman Hispania
- History of Alicante
- Timeline of Alicante
