= Conquest of madina Laqant =

1247 conquest

Conquest of the madina Laqant
- Part of History of Alacant
Date	1247–1266
Location	Alacant, Sharq al-Andalus
Result	Incorporation into the Kingdom of Murcia, later to the Kingdom of Valencia.

The Conquest of the madina Laqant was an episode in the history of the modern-day city of Alacant (Valencian Country, Spain) in which the city was taken by Christian forces from the independent authority of the Sharq al-Andalus (the eastern region of al-Andalus). The process of occupation was gradual and extended from 1247 to 1266.

Until the 19th century, some chroniclers and local historians considered either 6 December 1244 or 4 December 1248 as the date of a kind of "Christian foundation" of Alacant (Alicante, in Castilian language). Today, however, historians regard these commemorative dates as later inventions without historical basis.

The first occupation occurred at some point between 1247 and 1252 under the Crown of Castile. A second occupation followed on 4 March 1266, this time by a Catalan army led by James I of Aragon, known as the Conqueror. The intervention was carried out in support of two of his daughters: the infanta Constance of Aragon, and the queen consort of Castile, Violant of Aragon. Violant held Alacant as part of her marriage dowry when she married Alfonso X "the Wise" of Castile.

The Christian conquerors began a process of colonization with settlers from Catalonia, Aragon and Castile. The former Muslim stronghold of hisn Laqant (fortified settlement of Laqant) was incorporated into the Kingdom of Murcia until 1296, when it was recovered for the Kingdom of Valencia through the Murcian campaign of James II of Aragon.

== Background ==
Count Ramon Berenguer I assumed religious jurisdiction for the County of Barcelona over the Hispano-Arab Christians of the Emirate of Dénia —which included the medina al-Laqant— at the proposal of emir Iqbal-ad-Dawla, in an agreement signed in December 1057. Later, in the 12th century, Count Ramon Berenguer IV asserted for the first time Aragonese-Catalan claims over Alacant. This was reflected in the Treaty of Tudilén, agreed in 1151 with the Castilian king Alfonso VII. From that moment on, al-Laqant was included within the area of expansion envisaged for Catalonia and Aragon.

In 1240, however, the city of Alacant was allocated to the Castilian sphere of influence when James I of Aragon, granted it to the infante Alfonso of Castile —later king Alfonso X of Castile. This transfer was part of the dowry negotiations for the marriage of James’s daughter, the infanta Violant of Aragon, together with her siblings Constance of Aragon and Manuel of Castile. As a result, territories were divided along the so-called Biar–Busot line (a frontier boundary that was entirely notional for the Andalusi population). This arrangement was formally recorded in the Treaty of Almizra of 1244.

In practice, however, the monarchs of Aragon continued to reserve the right to supervise and protect sovereignty over Alacant, as well as over Dénia and Murcia. This derived from the earlier commitment, dating back to Ramon Berenguer I, to protect the Christians of the region. This explains both the swift intervention of James I on behalf of his son-in-law Alfonso of Castile during the Mudéjar revolts of 1264–1266, and also the subsequent invasion of Murcia in 1296 by James II of Aragon, known as the Just. The latter campaign represented an irredentist achievement for the Crown of Aragon, fulfilling its long-standing territorial aspirations over the towns of Alacant, Oriola and Murcia.

== Fall of al-Laqant ==
Alacant had originally formed part of the Emirate of Daniyya, but this Islamic kingdom disintegrated after the Catalan conquest of Mallorca. Part of its territory was absorbed by the Emirate of Mursiyya, while the northern portion became a taifa linked to the Emirate of Balansiya. After the fall of València to Christian forces in 1238, its last emir, Zayyan ibn Mardanish, established himself as rais (local governor) of the medina Laqant in 1241. From there, he attempted to retain control over the remaining territory of the former Valencian emirate that had not yet been taken by the Christians, stretching from Alzira to La Vila Joiosa.

=== The rebel madina ===
In 1243, the emir of Múrcia, Baha al-Dawla, signed the Treaty of Alcaraz with the infante Alfonso of Castile, by which the Mudéjar kingdom of Múrcia became a protectorate and vassal of Castile. However, Zayyan refused to accept the pact, rejected Castilian sovereignty, and declared Alacant independent from the Mudéjar kingdom of Múrcia. Before becoming rais of Alacant, Zayyan had briefly served as emir of Múrcia for about two years. During that period, he proclaimed the submission of the emirate to the sovereignty of the Almohad Caliphate of Ifríqiya through the khutba (Friday sermon). It is therefore possible that Zayyan maintained personal ties with the Almohad caliph in Ifríqiya, from whom he may have received support in order to resist the Christian siege of Alacant for four years. By doing so, he aligned himself with the wider Mudéjar revolts of the southern towns of the future Kingdom of València, which were led by the rebel Ibn Hudhayl as-Saghir, better known as al-Azraq.

As the last emir of València, Zayyan understood the fate that awaited the Andalusi population under Christian feudal rule. For this reason, he attempted a mass relocation of Andalusi inhabitants from Alacant to the island of Menorca. When he met James I of Aragon in 1240 at the rábida of Bairén (today the castle of Sant Joan, in Gandia), Zayyan proposed exchanging Menorca for the territory of hisn Laqant. This may have been an effort to secure a safe refuge for the Andalusi population. Although James I rejected the proposal, arguing that he could not break the dynastic treaties binding the Crown of Aragon with Castile, Zayyan at least gained valuable time. This delay allowed for the possible evacuation of part of the Muslim elite towards Ifriqiya, since madina Laqant remained in rebellion long enough to make such a transfer feasible —not only of leading families from Alacant itself, but also from València and Múrcia.

Thus, the hisn of Laqant found itself under military pressure on two fronts. From the north, the armies of the Crown of Aragon advanced progressively towards Biar and La Vila Joiosa; from the south, the hisn of Elx remained loyal to Baha al-Dawla, while Crevillent allied itself with Castile under the infante Manuel. In this situation, Alacant was effectively besieged, and its only possible escape route was by sea, through its natural harbour at the beach of Baver. In the 13th century, Alacant possessed the only Muslim-controlled seaport along the Mediterranean coast between the Ebre Delta and Almeria. This port maintained active trade and transport links with Ténès in Ifriquiya (present-day Algeria and Tunisia) which provided an outlet for exile. The fact that Alacant was the last madina of the Emirate of Murcia to fall under feudal domination can therefore be explained by this unique strategic position, which enabled the evacuation of part of its Andalusi population by sea.

Around 1247, Zayyan was the last to leave Laqant by sea. He sailed towards Kairuan, where he was received with honours by the Almohad caliph al-Mustansir. The caliph appointed him governor of that important Tunisian city. With Zayyan’s departure, a political vacuum opened in the amal (district) of Laqant. For some months, the town seems to have been governed in a precarious and autonomous way by its aljama council, marking the beginning of the final collapse of the small city of Laqant.

=== Entry into the castle ===
After Zayyan’s departure and the political vacuum it created, the defence of the castle passed into the hands of an al-wazir named al-Azraq. He went on to lead the first Mudéjar revolt against the Christian occupiers between 1247 and 1258, centred mainly on the towns south of the Kingdom of València. The castle of the Bena'Laqantil was extremely difficult to capture by force. Because of the layout of the walls and the position of the town itself on a coastal cliff at the foot of the Benacantil, the medina could not be entered without first taking the fortress. Since no surviving documents provide details about the exact circumstances of the castle’s capture by Christian forces, historians disagree on the precise date when it fell. Nevertheless, most agree that the laqantins must have put up strong resistance.

The name Castle of Santa Bàrbara is much later. In 1640, the chronicler Vicente Bendicho still referred to it as the castle of the Face, in allusion to the local popular nickname Cara del Moro (Moor’s Face, the natural rock profile of a human face visible on the slope of Mount Benacantil). It was not until 1469 —two centuries later— that a church dedicated to Saint Barbara was built at the site. For this reason, although tradition long considered 4 or 6 December 1244 or 1248 as the dates of the fall of the madina Laqant, in fact these commemorations are ahistorical. The 4 December date appears to have been invented to give more importance to the church of Saint Barbara, while the 6 December date, under the patronage of Saint Nicholas, was promoted to justify the later granting of co-cathedral status to the church of Sant Nicolau. Devotion to this saint had its origin among Italian fishermen settled in the Raval Roig neighbourhood of Alacant in AD 16. Moreover, in 1244 the medina was still ruled by rais Zayyan.

== Christian colonization ==
In any case, Alacant passed under Castilian sovereignty by the express decision of king James "the Conqueror", who had granted it as dowry in the marriage of his daughter Violant of Aragon to the infante Alfonso of Castile. In exchange, according to the Treaty of Almizra of 1244, Alfonso conceded to the Aragonese monarch the right to recover Alacant —and the surrounding southern Valencian lands— at any time, as a gesture of diplomatic goodwill between the two crowns. It should be understood that the concept of “border” at the time differed greatly from today: it did not mean a fixed line on a map, but wide frontier territories known as marches (hence the Marquisates of Dénia, Elx, or Villena).

The new feudal lords found a largely depopulated city. The few Muslim families who remained were expelled from the madina, which from then on was called the Vila Vella (“Old Town”). The native Andalusi population was displaced across the countryside of Alacant, obliged to abandon their homes and to renounce communal landholdings, which were expropriated in favour of the new Christian landowners. Most Mudéjar inhabitants of Alacant resettled in the valleys of the Alacant plain, between Mutxamel and l’Alcoraia, and in the Vinalopó plain, between Novelda and Montfort, without military defence or protection.

Nevertheless, the new feudal authorities tolerated their presence for economic reasons and because the Castilian policy of colonization in Alacant —and in the Kingdom of Múrcia more broadly— suffered from a lack of sufficient Christian settlers. By 1252, five years after Zayyan’s exile, the first documentary evidence of effective Castilian rule appears: a royal privilege of Alfonso X establishing the city's Council of Alacant, a municipal institution that lasted throughout the five centuries of the Furs of Valencia until the Nueva Planta decrees of 1707.

The details of Christian repopulation are unknown because the Llibre de Repartiment has been lost. The privileges granted by Alfonso X are therefore better understood as declarations of intent than as records of reality. The shortage of settlers was compounded by the limited diversity of trades among them, since most were men-at-arms, especially foot soldiers and crossbowmen. As a result, the exile of part of the Andalusi inhabitants of the medina Laqant —particularly those with enough resources to pay for sea passage to Ifriqiya— created a serious lack of artisans, merchants, experienced sailors, and experts in the irrigation system of the assuts that sustained the Horta d'Alacant. The economic and commercial prosperity that madina Laqant had once enjoyed, thanks to its Baver port and Mediterranean trade links, disappeared completely as Christian knights became the new urban patriciate.

As for the origin of the new settlers, their profile resembles that of nearby Oriola, which is better documented thanks to the register of wills preserved in the Llibre de Beneficis de Santa Maria. Most settlers came from the Crown of Aragon, mainly from Catalonia, whether directly or via València, while only about 20% came from the kingdoms of Castile. Castilian settlers were generally reluctant to establish themselves, unlike Catalans, who were more interested in maritime trade. Consequently, Christian colonization triggered an economic crisis in Alacant due to the sudden demographic rupture, and commercial, agricultural, export, and fishing activities did not recover until the creation of the first guilds in the 14th century, once the town had been integrated into the Kingdom of València.

== See also ==
- History of Alacant
- Zayyan ibn Mardanish

== Bibliography ==
- Azuar Ruiz, Rafael (1990). "Historiografía, fuentes y leyendas". In Rafael Azuar Ruiz, José Hinojosa Montalvo (coords.) (ed.). Edad Media islámica (PDF) (in Spanish). Vol. II. Patronat Municipal per a la commemoració del Cinquè Centenari de la Ciutat d'Alacant. pp. 20–34.
- Azuar Ruiz, Rafael (1990). "La desarticulación de la sociedad islámica. Conquista y represión castellana". In Rafael Azuar Ruiz, José Hinojosa Montalvo (coords.) (ed.). Edad Media islámica (PDF) (in Spanish). Vol. II. Patronat Municipal per a la commemoració del Cinquè Centenari de la Ciutat d'Alacant. pp. 174–185.
- Azuar Ruiz, Rafael (1990). "La ciudad, eje del nuevo sistema". In Rafael Azuar Ruiz, José Hinojosa Montalvo (coords.) (ed.). Edad Media islámica (PDF) (in Spanish). Vol. II. Patronat Municipal per a la commemoració del Cinquè Centenari de la Ciutat d'Alacant. pp. 91–97.
- Bendicho, Vicente (1640). Chronica de la muy ilustre, noble y leal ciudad de Alacant (in Spanish) (Biblioteca Virtual Miguel de Cervantes 2018 ed.).
- Camarero Casas, Eduardo (1997). Libro antiguo de beneficios de la parroquial iglesia de Santa María (in Spanish). Instituto Juan Gil-Albert, Diputació Provincial d'Alacant.
- del Estal, Juan Manuel (1976). "Alicante en el contexto expansionista de Jaime el Conquistador". Revista del Instituto de Estudios Alicantinos (in Spanish). 19: 25–36.
- del Estal, Juan Manuel (1981). "Conquista y repoblación de Orihuela y Alacant por Alfonso X el Sabio". Revista del Instituto de Estudios Alicantinos (in Spanish). 33: 65–102.
- del Estal, Juan Manuel (1990). "Conquista y repoblación". In Rafael Azuar Ruiz, José Hinojosa Montalvo (coords.) (ed.). Edad Media cristiana (PDF) (in Spanish). Vol. II. Patronat Municipal per a la commemoració del Cinquè Centenari de la Ciutat d'Alacant. pp. 210–233.
- Garrido i Valls, Josep-David (1997). Jaume I i el Regne de Múrcia. Col·lecció Bofarull, 3 (in Catalan). Rafael Dalmau.
- Hinojosa Montalvo, José Ramón (1991). "Demografía y poblamiento en Alacant durante la Baja Edad Media: siglos XIII–XV". Estudios de Historia Medieval. Homenaje a Luis Suárez (in Spanish). Universidad de Valladolid: 267–282. ISBN 84-7762-220-5.
- Khaldún, Ibn (1978) [1852–1856]. Histoire des berbères et des dynasties musulmanes de l'Afrique Septentrional (Kitâb al-ʿIbar) (in French and Arabic). Vol. II. Translated by Baró de Slane. Libraire Orientaliste.
- Rosser Limiñana, Pablo (2012). La ciudad explicada en su castillo (in Spanish). Museu de la Ciutat d'Alacant.
- Torró Abad, Josep (2006). El naixement d'una colònia: Dominació i resistència a la frontera valenciana (in Catalan). Publicacions de la Universitat de València. ISBN 978-84-370-6458-1.
