= History of Alicante =

History of Spanish city

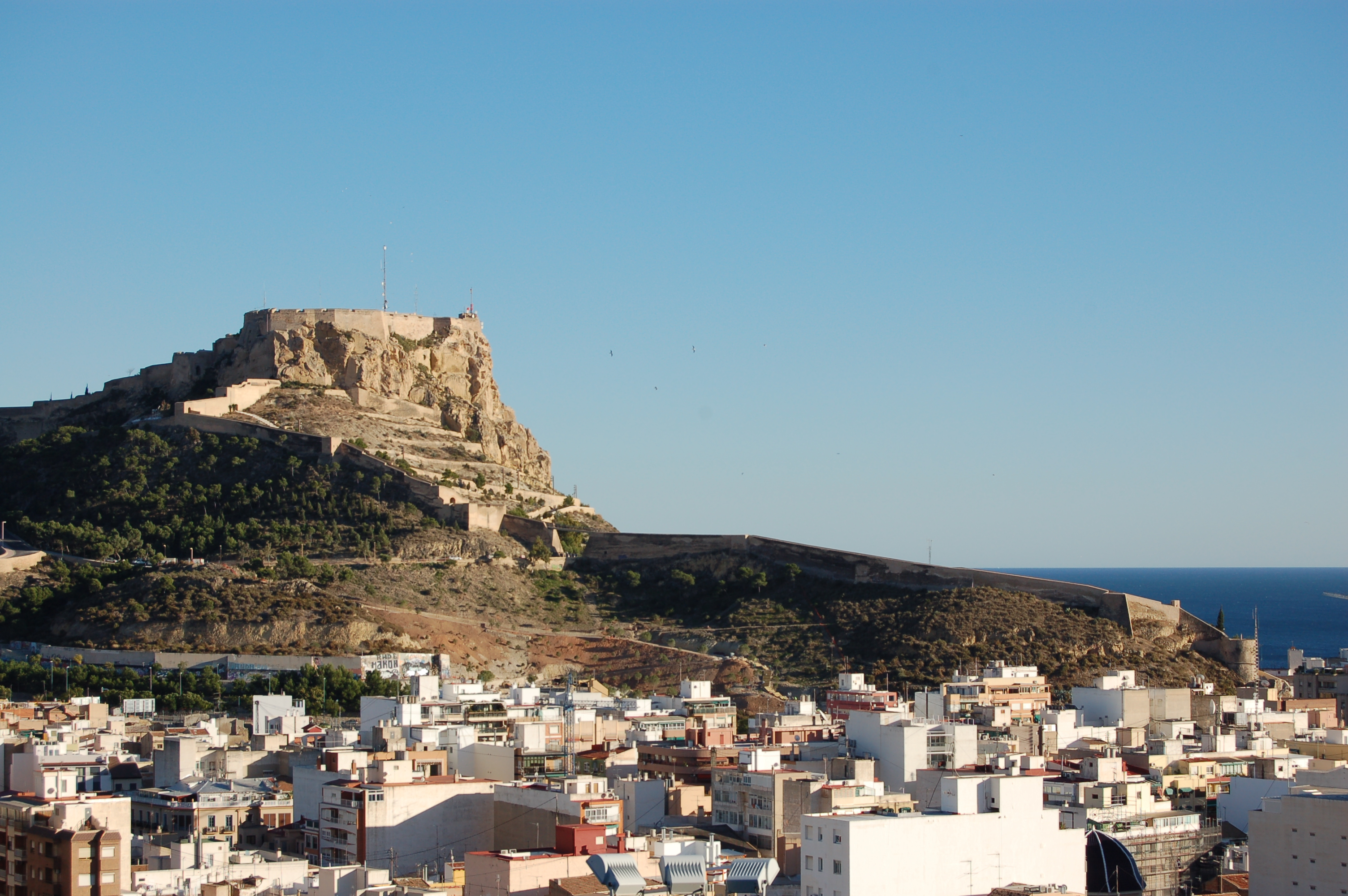
Santa Bárbara Castle at the top of Mount Benacantil

The history of Alicante spans thousands of years. Alicante has been regarded as a strategic military location on the Mediterranean coast of Spain since ancient times. It is protected on the south-west by Cape Santa Pola and on the north-east by Cape Huerta. The fortified complex of Santa Bárbara Castle (Valencian: Castell de Santa Bàrbara), the older parts of which were built in the 9th century, dominates the city from a height of 160 m atop Mount Benacantil, a rocky massif overlooking the sea.

The first settlements in the Alicante area were made by Iberian tribes. Since then it has been inhabited successively by Phoenicians, Greeks, Romans, Goths, Moors, and Spaniards. Some of the earliest settlements were made on the slopes of Mount Benacantil, where the Santa Bárbara Castle stands today. As a part of the Roman province of Hispania under the name '"Lucentum", it was ruled by the Roman Republic and later the Roman Empire.

== Antiquity ==
=== Phoenician trading city ===
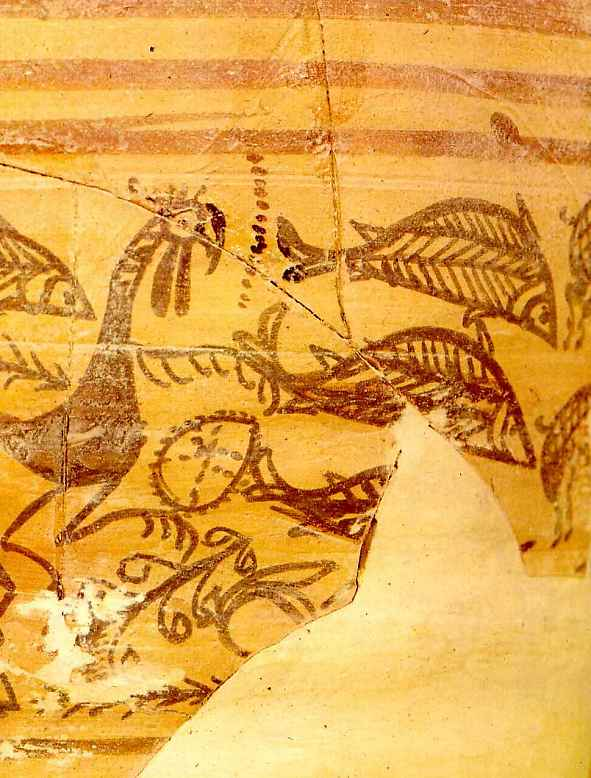
Iberian ceramics. Archaeological site of Tossal de Manises, ancient Iberian-Carthaginian-Roman settlement of Akra-Leuke or Lucentum. Now at the Archaeological Museum of Alicante.

Phoenician traders began commercial exchanges with the native Iberians of the eastern coast of Spain in the 8th century BC. and had established coastal settlements as far north as the lower River Segura valley in the province of Alicante. By the 7th century BC Phoenicians were introducing the Phoenician alphabet, iron working and the pottery wheel to the Iberians. During the 6th century BC Phocaean Greeks established small trading ports on the coast, Recent excavations of a small, native Iberian coastal trading center at La Picola (Santa Pola) in Alicante province reveal enough Greek architectural elements to suggest a Greek presence at the site.

The Phoenicians founded a trading post at Tossal de Manises, while a settlement at La Fonteta, 28 km south of Alicante, was one of the most important Phoenician cities in the western Mediterranean. It was situated on the right bank of the River Segura estuary on the coast, a strategic position that permitted it to control trade and access to the region's mineral resources through connections it maintained with native Iberian communities. The habitation is surrounded by a defensive wall, punctuated by towers, dating from approximately the first half of the 8th century to the middle of the 6th century BC.

=== Carthaginian rule ===
By the last years of the 6th century BC, the rival armies of Carthage and Rome began to invade and fight for control of the Iberian Peninsula. The Carthaginian general Hamilcar Barca carried out his Iberian conquests in 237–228 BC, and established the fortified settlement of Ákra Leukḗ, or Akra Leuce, (Greek: Ἀκρα Λευκή, meaning "White Citadel" or "White Promontory"), at the eastern end of the Punic province on the south-eastern coast of Spain, where Alicante stands today.

The material culture evidenced by objects found in the cemeteries at Tossal de les Basses and La Albufereta shows the cultural expressions of people with different cultural backgrounds sharing a common urban space to pursue economic development. This would explain why the settlements at Tossal les Basses and Illeta dels Banyets appear to be well-connected to trade routes on the Mediterranean through their harbour facilities, the movement of goods via maritime trade being developed by merchants.

According to Aranegui and Sánchez, there is no scholarly consensus on how to interpret the impact of foreign groups on local societies, although the cultural interactions between Phoenicians, Greeks, Punics, and indigenous people have been a major focus of archaeological research in the Iberian Peninsula. Some scholars believe that these foreign groups were the driving force behind social and economic change, while others argue that the mere presence of foreign peoples does not necessarily lead to such changes.

The settlement at Tossal de les Basses was situated next to a lagoon on the Mediterranean coast. It had harbour infrastructure and a fortified wall punctuated by towers, dating to the fifth century BC, which suggest that this part of the Spanish coast was becoming increasingly important politically, economically, and socially. Aranegui and Sánchez demonstrate how excavations on the site of the ancient settlement offer a glimpse into interactions between the Punic people and local Iberians. Outside the settlement walls, there was an industrial area where metalworking and pottery were produced. Iron forges and furnaces for smelting galena to extract silver have been found, but comprehensive descriptions of these sites are not yet available. This industrial area provides evidence of the settlement's involvement in trade with other Mediterranean regions. The presence of kilns and pottery factories indicate that it produced goods for export such as amphorae.

Paleoecological studies suggest that the main crops grown in the area were olives, grapes, pomegranates, apples, pears, and figs, which were also likely exported. The seeds of cereal grains have not been found in the industrial area. The coastal settlement at Tossal de les Basses was occupied mainly by people who were involved in the processing and trade of produce including fruits and products derived from them, such as wine, on a large scale not matched in the inland settlements. The evidence suggests that several sites on the southeastern coast of Spain played a major role in the agrarian economy. It is not known whether these agricultural activities took place near the settlements or whether they imported produce from inland sites to process and export.

At the top of the Tossal de les Basses, an Iberian settlement is documented from around the 4th century BC by wooden artefacts recovered in archaeological excavations of wells dug to supply water to an Iberian village. The settlement was abandoned during the Punic conquest of south-eastern Iberia, in which the Carthaginian Barcids established a large fortification in the Tossal de Manises around 230 BC, which years later developed an urban structure. Its place name in the Iberian language could have been LAKKANTÓ, which would refer to the geographical features of the land where the fortified city was located. It is also possible that this is the Akra Leuké mentioned by Diodorus of Sicily.

This large Carthaginian fortification was the first documented use of the Tossal de Manises site. Initially intended strictly for military defence, a few years later it was urbanised and transformed into a fortified city. The new occupation led to the abandonment of the previous Iberian settlement at Tossal de les Basses, and it is probable that the Iberians had relocated to the settlement of Punic origin, which had a port with access to the sea. The Carthaginians called it by the Greek name Leuce, according to Diodorus, who described it as a military camp set up by Hamilcar Barca during the Barcid conquest of part of Iberia around 230 BC.

However, this name was a Phoenician exonym adapted to an existing place name in the Iberian language, whose exact spelling is not known. One of the most recent theories is that the name is based on the topography of the terrain, so "LAK" corresponds to "cove", and "KANT" to "hill", with the Iberian genitive in the suffix - Ó, giving rise to the name "LAKKANT (Ó)", meaning "those of the hillside cove". Dexter Hoyos writes that text-editors have altered the Latin name "Castrum Altum" that appears in Livy's manuscripts to "Castrum Album", mistakenly connecting it to Acra Leuce, which was identified with Alicante.

=== Roman conquest ===
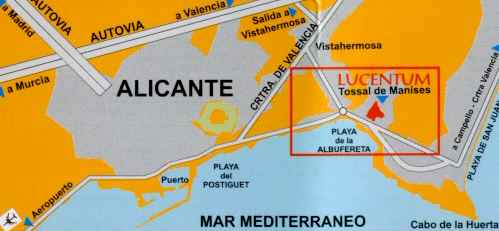
Location of Lucentum at Tossal de Manises

The city was destroyed in 209 BC during the Second Punic War, and the fortification abandoned; thus the settlement was in a state of neglect throughout the 2nd century BC, but during the Sertorian War, fought from 80 to 72 BC, it was rebuilt, and under the Principate of Augustus (27 BC-14 AD) it was refounded as a municipality under Latin law, with the name Lucentum. The toponym is first attested in inscriptions and in history books at this time. The name Lucentum appearing in ancient sources has in the past been placed by later historians at different points in Alicante, but historiography has accepted its location at the Tossal de Manises since the 1990s.

The reconstruction led to later urban development. Sometime between 30 and 20 BC the city's first forum was built marking Lucentum's new status as a municipium, perhaps about 26 BC, near the beginning of the reign of Augustus. This was followed by the planning and construction of the rest of the city that would last until the first decades of the 1st century AD.

Lucentum had a period of some splendour from the end of the 1st century BC through the 1st century AD. Despite this early vitality, the city began to decline in the time of Vespasian, during whose reign the tasks of maintaining the sewer system of the forum, as well as the public baths, were abandoned.

During the 1st and 2nd centuries, looting and dumping of waste took place in the forum area, and the city declined gradually throughout the 2nd century. The 3rd century saw the abandonment of the city when it lost its status as a Roman municipality, the municipium of Lucentum, whose territory would be assimilated into that of Ilici, (today's Elche). The chief cause of Lucentum's decline was competition from Ilici, which had better water and land communications (it stood on the Via Augusta) and began to usurp Lucentum's trade. The place name must have survived linked to the place, as in the 7th century the Geographer of Ravenna mentions Lucentes. Remains of comestibles from the Late Roman period found by archaeologist Paul Reynolds in the present-day Benalúa urban area include hulled barley, wheat, lentils and peas, pine nuts, peaches, and grapes. He has also recovered traces there of saltwort and sea blite, plants growing in the saltmarsh that were used to make soda ash flux for the manufacture of glass.

An urban nucleus was established on the slopes of Mount Benacantil, where have been found the remains of a Late Roman settlement for which the same Romanised name Lacant was used, that is, a relict place name, which would evolve into the Arabic form Laqant, mentioned in the pact of Theodemir (713) and the predecessor of the modern name Alicante. The hypothesis that the municipality of Lucentum was the predecessor of Laqant has been commonly accepted by historians, but archaeologist L. Abad Casal of the University of Alicante (Universitat d'Alacant) notes that this has been brought into question in the light of new evidence uncovered in archaeological excavations and in research by teams from the university and the municipal authorities of Alicante.

== Muslim al-Laqant ==
=== Kūra of Tudmīr ===
Eventually, the Roman settlement was depopulated, until a new urban demographic concentration developed between the 6th and 7th centuries. Archaeological excavations show that during the early years of the Muslim occupation of Iberia the site at Tossal de Manises was used as a Muslim cemetery, called in Arabic a maqbara (مقبرة), dated to between the 8th and 10th centuries. It seems likely that the Andalusī Laqant was already developed on the other side of the Serra Grossa hill, at the current historic centre of the city, on the foundations of an earlier Hispano-Roman settlement that would have been moved at some point in late antiquity (4th–8th centuries). In that case, the toponym would not be of Arabic origin but of a Romanised Iberian substrate.

Between 718 and 1247 the town remained under the domination of the Muslims in the territorial demarcation of the Xarq (or Sharq) al-Andalus (in Arabic: شرق الاندلس), who named it Madīnah Laqant or Medina Laqant (in Arabic: مدينة القنت, which means "the city of Laqant"), abbreviated al-Lqant (Arabic: اَلقنت). Some scholars consider this the direct origin of the current name in Valencian, Alacant, as well as the initial form of Alicante in Spanish. It was also known by the name of Laqant-al-Qubra (لَقَنت الكوبرة), that is, "Great Alicante", to differentiate it from Laqant-al-Hosun which corresponds to a different town, Llutxent, in the Serra d'Aitana.

Alicante was one of the seven cities that formed the so-called kingdom of Tudmīr by the Pact of Theodemir in 713, made between the last Visigothic governor of the area, Theodemir, (called Tudmīr b. Abdūsh in Arabic sources) a Visigothic Christian count and Abd al-Aziz ibn Musa. The treaty specifically mentions the city by the name of Laqant, the form calcified by the Arabic speakers of al-Andalus. Rafael Azuar Ruiz writes that during the reign of the Kūra of Tudmīr, the Alicante population was scattered in the hills around Alicante, its economy based on farming Mediterranean dryland crops such as cereals, olives and grape vines, in addition to using products of the land such as wild animals, honey, or esparto grass. The town had a market and ships were built there as well.

The inhabitants of the small traditional urban centres, such as Antigons (present-day Benalúa) or Tossal de Manises, moved to these medium-altitude locations which were depopulated, while a small Muslim garrison settled in the fortress of Bena Laqantil. In terms of the political situation, the Andalusī authorities respected the agreements of the Pact of Theodomir regarding the freedom of the Hispano-Roman population, more pagan than Christian, to adhere to the traditional animist religious beliefs of their ancestors.

The Hispano-Gothic elite, a very small and insular social group of Germanic origin, had still managed to retain commercial and tax privileges in Alicante, but their position was displaced by the new ruling class; this was formed of members of the military contingents of the Balŷ, who had originated in the Mediterranean Levant and Egypt and had settled in the balad Balansiya (Land of Valencia) and the Kūra of Tudmīr since the year 746. Many of the local aristocracy feared losing their privileges and sought to preserve their status by intermarriage with their Muslim overlords. The conquerors likewise tried to ally themselves with the local landed aristocracy through intermarriage to secure their new landholdings and legitimate their own political position.

The influx of new settlers led to the repopulation and revitalisation of the ancient Roman towns, while the vast majority of the population, consisting of Hispano-Roman converts to Islam, the muwalladīn, continued to occupy the higher elevation settlements of the late Roman period near Alicante, or they dispersed into the interior seeking defensible locations to settle, such as Fontcalent, La Murta, or La Ereta (a small plain on the sunny side of Benacantil). The local aristocracy lost their privileges with the repeal of the Pact of Theodomir by the emir Abd al-Raḥmān I after he defeated Abd al-Rahmān ibn Habib, who had landed on the coast of Tudmīr at or near Alicante with his troops from Ifrīqiya, intending to conquer al-Andalus in favour of the Abbasid Caliphate.

=== Emirate of Qurṭuba ===
The former kingdom of Tudmīr now became a province of the Umayyad emirate of Córdoba, as the Kūra of Tudmīr. After the destruction of the ports of Valencia and Cartagena by Abd-al-Rahman I, the port of the madīnah Laqant would be the only usable harbour in the 9th century on the coast between the Ebro Delta and Almería. This circumstance marked the beginning of a stable town at the foot of the Benacantil, where lived sailors who were engaged in fishing, piracy and the white slave trade with Ifrīqiya. During the reign of the emir Muhammad I, the madīnah began to acquire strategic importance thanks to the impregnability of its castle and the commercial revival of the nearby Via Augusta. The emirs divided the balad Balansiya, or "country of Valencia", into two large administrative divisions, the mamlaka Balansiya, which made up the northern and central regions, with its capital in Valencia, and the southern area, the country of Tudmīr, which was part of the mamlaka Mursīyyah.

According to Rafael Azuar Ruiz and Manuel Acién Almansa, the ruling class of Laqant joined the rebellion of ʿUmar ibn Ḥafṣūn between the years 880 and 918 to defend their prestige as descendants of the Visigothic aristocracy, an origin they shared with ibn Ḥafṣūn. Also supporting the cause were the muwalladīn, who suffered from excessively high taxes that the emirate had imposed on them to pay the salaries of the professionalised armies. After suppressing the revolt of ibn Ḥafṣūn, Abd al-Rahman III proclaimed the imārat Qurṭuba (قرطبة) and, with the help of Berbers settled in al-Madīnah Kunka (Cuenca), took Kalyusha (Callosa) and recognised Muhammad ibn Abd al-Rahman al-Sayj as its governor in 924. This is the origin of the Banū Sayj dynasty, whose members are the first historical persons known with a direct connection to Laqant.

Following the suppression of the revolts of the Banū Sayj lords (924–928) in the Tudmīr and Valencia region, the emirate commenced pacification of the populace with innovations in the tax system that caused state revenue to grow exponentially. A new social policy banned the intermingling of Muslims with Hispano-Romans, and led to the abandonment of the latter's enclaves and of the long-established oppida, as well as the castles held by the Berber dynasty, who had fled the country. The countryside was reorganised, the inland mountain defensive system being replaced by a network of forts and watchtowers, concentrating the rural population in fortified communities formed of castral units that linked castles with attached villages. Administration of the Xarq al-Andalus was centralised in Kalyusha and Laqant, with its defensive system constituted of these ḥuṣūn, or castle complexes.

=== Xarq al-Andalus ===
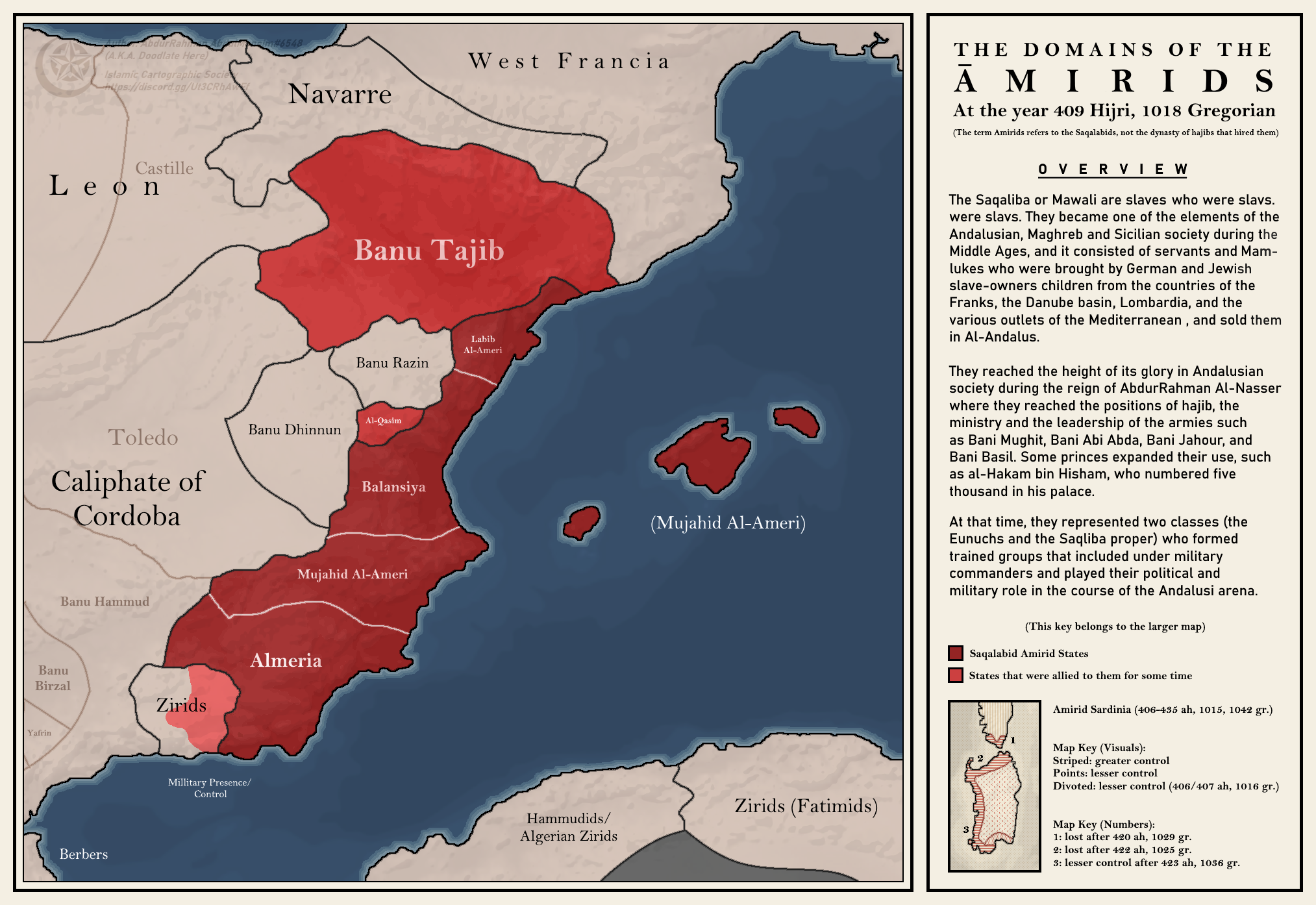
The Ṣaqāliba separated Laqant (and the entire Balad Balansiya) from the Caliphate of Córdoba in the 11th century.

Attempts by the Caliphate of Córdoba to restore its former splendour did not last long. Having consolidated his power on the peninsula, the Slavic (ṣaqāliba) (صقلبي) warlord Mujāhid al-ʿĀmirī proclaimed the Ṭāʾifa of Dāniya and conquered the militarily and commercially strategic Balearic Islands in 1014, apparently defeating Khayrān al -Amiri's fleet.

Control of the Balearics gave Mujāhid a supply centre on the commercial routes of the western Mediterranean, a defensive outpost for his territories on the mainland, and a base from which to launch maritime attacks as part of his policy of 'jihad at sea'. Under his able rule, the Ṭāʾifa of Dāniya became one of the richest and most powerful of the taifa kingdoms. In 1021, expanding his dominions to the south, Mujāhid incorporated the madīnahs of Elx (Elche), Ūriyūla (Orihuela) and Laqant; in 1038 he gained possession of Lūrqa (Lorca). During the rule of the Banū Mujāhid, Laqant enjoyed the free trade that was the linchpin of Dāniya's naval and commercial control of the western Mediterranean. Social well-being increased, and cultural and scientific advances were made in a context of peaceful political relations with the neighboring emirates of Mursīyyah and Dāniya, and even with the Christian County of Barcelona.

According to the chronicler Muhammad al-Idrīsī, Laqant was a prosperous town in the 11th century, with a sūq or market and two mosques. The soil was fertile and produced abundant fruits and vegetables, figs and grapes. Isidore of Seville noted glass manufacture in the city during the 6th-7th centuries, referring to its production of alkaline ashes used in the process. Ropes made of spartum were exported through the port and fishing and commercial ships were built there. Its alcazaba (Arabic: citadel) was at the difficult-to-access peak of Benacantil, and was well garrisoned with troops. During this century, the madīnah Sagira Laqant became an important exit port to North Africa, where it would connect the Xarq al-Andalus with the rest of the Islamic world. On the other hand, it would also become an important node for the Via Augusta that connected it to Balansiya, Mursīyyah and the rest of al-Andalus, while following the river Vinalopó facilitated access to the peninsular interior. This would turn it into an important commercial and maritime centre of the entire Mediterranean area, as well as the port for shipping the surplus agricultural productions of the extensive area described by the chronicler al-Idrīsī.

In 1091 the city was among those conquered by the Almoravid Yūsuf ibn Tāshfīn, who had taken and occupied al-Mariyya, as well as Mursīyyah, Xàtiva and Dāniya. It then passed to Sayf-al-Dawla, who died in the battle of Albacete in 1146. During these centuries the population of Laqant was scattered in small settlements towards the interior, at medium altitudes around the foot of Mount Benacantil, named Banū al-Qatil by the geographer al-Idrīsī. It wasn't until well into the 11th century that an urban structure began to develop on what is now the Vila Vella, coinciding with the introduction of the mercantile tax system under the orders of the emir of Mursīyyah, Allāh ibn ʿIyād.

Territory controlled by the "Wolf King" ibn Mardanīsh

In 1147 Laqant became part of the domains of Muhàmmad Muḥammad ibn Mardanīsh (called the Wolf King in Christian sources), a political and military leader who ruled the Ṭāʾifa of Mursīyyah and Balansiya, dominating the entire Xarq al-Andalus from Balansiya to al-Mariyya (Almería). During the second taifa period Mardanīsh fought against the invading Almohads. Although he was defeated by them at the Battle of Fahs al-Jullab in 1165, his domains were not completely conquered until his death in 1172.

Following the death of Mardanīsh in 1172, the Almohads arrived in Laqant, where they implemented their administrative model of the ḥuṣūn in government, a model which encouraged the urban development of the madīnah by having a multi-purpose area linked to its main castle (ḥuṣūn or amal), with other castles and farmhouses (or kura ) also linked in the interior. The centres of population were located on the perimeter of the cultivated fields and in the areas where livestock was herded or fish were caught, so that there was a population balance between the river valleys, the mountains and the coast.

In the case of Alicante, the Ḥiṣn Laqant was a castle/village in the amal (administrative district) of madīna Laqant, to which the ḥuṣūn of Busot, Agost, Cabrafix (Aigües), Tabaià (Aspe), Novelda (Niwala), and Montfort (called Nompot) were linked. The area had important economic activity: in the countryside stretching from the river Montnegre to Benimagrell and Cap d'Alcodre (Cabo de las Huertas), fruits including carobs, grapes, and figs were harvested, as well as barilla and salt from the saltmarshes. Barilla, or saltwort, was a source of the soda ash used in glassmaking and soapmaking. Grasslands in the mountainous areas produced flax and esparto, the fibers of which were exported to the countries of the Mediterranean. Linen manufactured from flax was used for fabrics, and to make sails and rafts for the fishing and pirate activities at Laqant, which had a natural harbor on the shore of Baver beach, half a league from the madīna, leaving through Porta Ferrissa towards the south. The ḥiṣn also covered part of the river basin of the Vinalopó, to the west.

The Andalusī socioeconomic model was based on a direct relationship (without subordinate intermediaries, as with feudalism) between the inhabitants and the Islamic state, represented by their emir or their caliph. They had to pay an annual tribute established by government officials in common agreement with the aljama (jāmiʿa) of the madīnah, or council of venerable elders. In the madīnah of Laqant, ploughmen, fishermen, herdsmen and artisans went to the market, or sūq (souk) to sell their products, and thus obtained the necessary currency to pay the tribute. The market in Alicante in Andalusī times was outside the walls, also towards the south, near the current Plaça del Portal d'Elx. In this sūq they came both from Laqant and from the other towns nearby (Alcoi, Elda, Villena or Elche), since the mina (port) of Laqant allowed the export of their wares by sea, as well as by land through the Via Augusta.

During the period of Almohad rule, Alicante was part of the emirate of Dāniya but this Islamic kingdom disintegrated with the Catalan invasion of Madīna Mayurqa (Mallorca) under the Aragonese king James I and the conquest of Ṭāʾifa Manūrqa (Menorca) in 1231, leaving a part united to the emirate of Mursīyyah and another part, to the north, became a taifa linked to the emirate of Balansiya. Thus, with the independence of the Andalusī polities from the Almohad empire, Laqant was part of the second Emirate of Mursīyyah before 1230, when it joined the cause of Ibn Hud, proclaimed emir of Mursīyyah when it became independent from the Almohads.

The rudimentary early medieval settlement at Laqant is the origin of the urban centre of the current city, between the Santa Creu district at the foot of Benacantil (Banū al-Qatil), and the Raval Roig, a neighbourhood on the coast historically inhabited mostly by fishermen.

== Christian conquest ==
The Muslims who conquered the Iberian Peninsula reached it by the Mediterranean sea. Most of the travellers who visited al-Andalus over the centuries entered it from eastern al-Andalus, i.e. Xarq al-Andalus, especially at the port cities of Mursīyyah, Laqant and Balansiyya, or from other ports in the southern peninsula. The Almohads reunified vast territories extending from Balinsiyya to Ṭarābulus al-Gharb (Tripoli) in Ifrīqiya, and implemented notable administrative and military reforms there also. The military strength of the Christian states eventually wore down the resistance of the Caliphate and in the second quarter of the 13th century they conquered the major Muslim territories of al-Andalus: Mayurqa (Mallorca) and Yabisah (Ibiza), Qurṭuba (Córdoba), Balansiyya (Valencia), Išbīliya (Seville), Laqant (Alicante), Mursīyyah (Murcia), and Gharb al-Andalus (the Algarve).

According to Juan Manuel del Estal, the Alicante region during Medieval times was a well-delineated buffer state located between two rival and often hostile kingdoms. It was first caught in the middle between the Muslim kingdom of Valencia under the Hafsid dynasty and the kingdom of Murcia under the Abbasid dynasty, and then, later, between the Aragonese kingdom of Valencia under James I and the Castilian kingdom of Murcia under Alfonso X the Wise. All of these actors sought control of Alicante's territories and its population. The Alicante region shifted its allegiance from one dominion to the other, whether initially to the Muslim polity of Xarq al-Andalus, or afterward to the Christian kingdoms of Valencia and Murcia.

With the fall of Balansiyya (Valencia) into Christian hands in 1238, its emir, Zayyan ibn Mardanīsh (grandson of the Wolf king), became the ruler of the Laqant madīnah in 1240. While trying to retain the remaining territory of the Balansiyyan emirate that had not yet fallen to the Christians, Zayyan offered James I the territory of the Ḥiṣn of Laqant in exchange for the island of Menorca. The king of Aragon did not agree to his proposal, reserving to himself the possibility of conquering the kasbah, or castle (alcazaba in Spanish) of al-Laqant, and by extension, the rest of Mursīyyah. In 1243, the emir of Mursīyyah, Baha' al Dawla of the Banū Hūd clan, signed the Treaty of Alcaraz with Castile which made the Hudid kingdom of Mursīyyah a vassal protectorate.

Pablo Rosser Limiñana says there is no consensus in documentary sources regarding the exact date of Laqant's seizure by the Castilians. These have nothing to say about the first decade of Castilian rule in the Taifa of Mursīyyah—not until August 1252 was a royal proclamation made concerning which villages were in its domain. Laqant was granted the charter of Córdoba, which was granted only to cities conquered without capitulation, alongside the privileges of Cartagena, in October. This indicates that Muslims were expelled from the city core and their houses and lands appropriated, therefore Laqant and its castle must have been taken with considerable resistance.

According to Raphael Azuar Ruiz, after seizing the Muslim city of Laqant from its governor, Zayyan ibn Mardanīsh, around 1247, Infante Alfonso did not evacuate the city's Muslim inhabitants, but exiled only the military leaders of the armed resistance. Evidently the Castilian settler cohort in the city was added by Alfonso, later known as King Alfonso the Wise, to the already existing Muslim community. Most of the population in the urban centre of Laqant at that time was Muslim, comprising more than two-thirds (about 2,100 people) of its total population (approximately 2,500), with newly settled Christians no more than ten per cent (about 250) of the total and Jews less than five per cent (about 120 people). Because of this political reality, the edicts of law that the Castilian monarch subsequently issued regarding Laqant had to take into account the entire population living there, including Mudéjar, Christians, and Jews.

== Early Modern Era ==
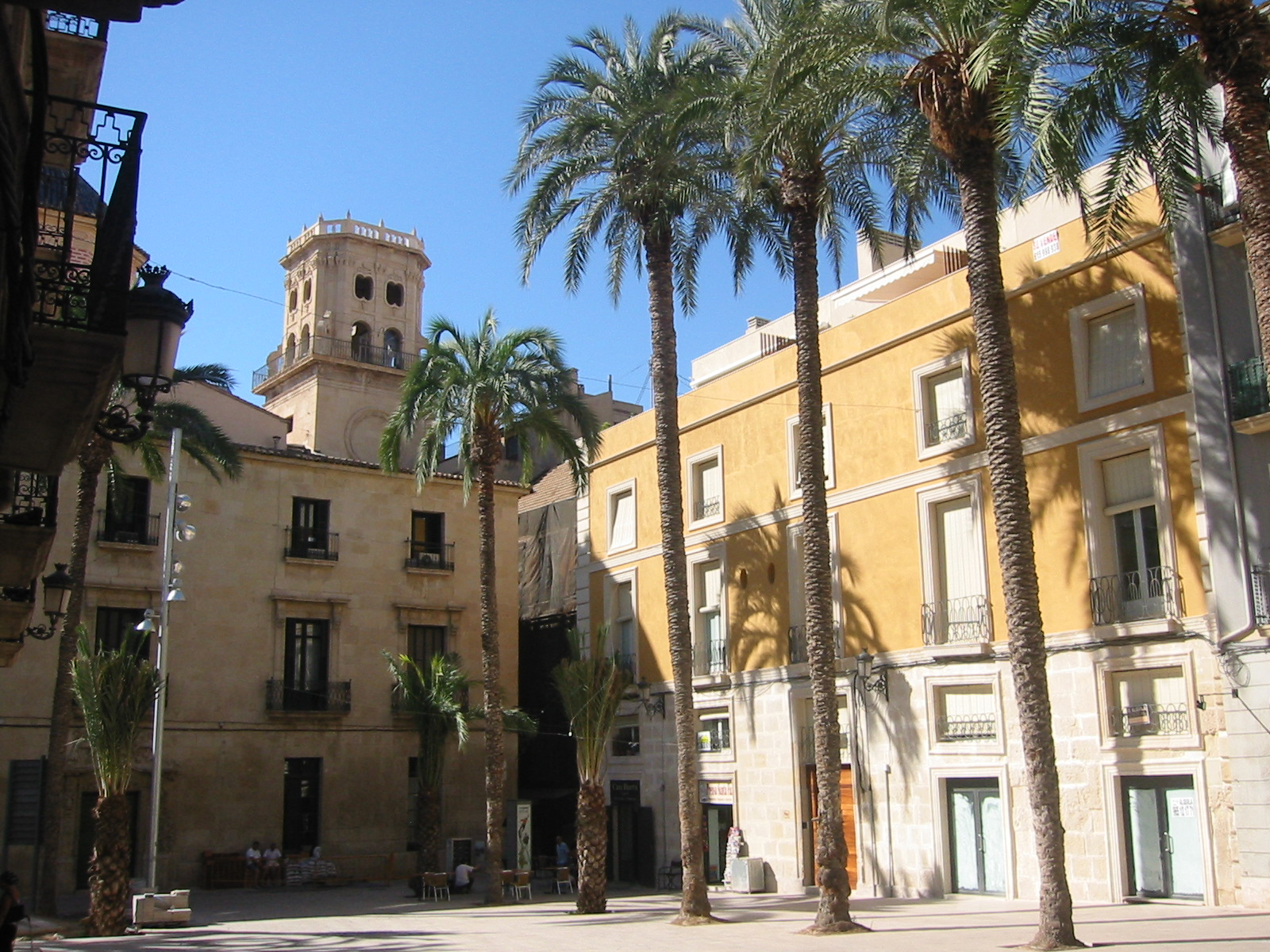
Monjas-Santa Faz Square in Alicante.

After several decades as a battle field between the Kingdom of Castile and the Crown of Aragon, Alicante enjoyed a golden age during the 15th century together with the whole Kingdom of Valencia, rising to become a major Mediterranean trading centre exporting rice, wine, olive oil, oranges and wool. Between 1609 and 1614, however, King Philip III expelled thousands of moriscos who had remained in Valencia after the reconquista. This act cost the region dearly – with so many skilled artisans and agricultural labourers gone, the feudal nobility found itself sliding into bankruptcy.

In the early 18th century Alicante, along with the rest of Valencia, backed Carlos in the War of Spanish Succession. Philip V won, and he punished the whole region by withdrawing the semi-autonomous status it had enjoyed since the time of the reconquista.

== 19th and 20th centuries ==
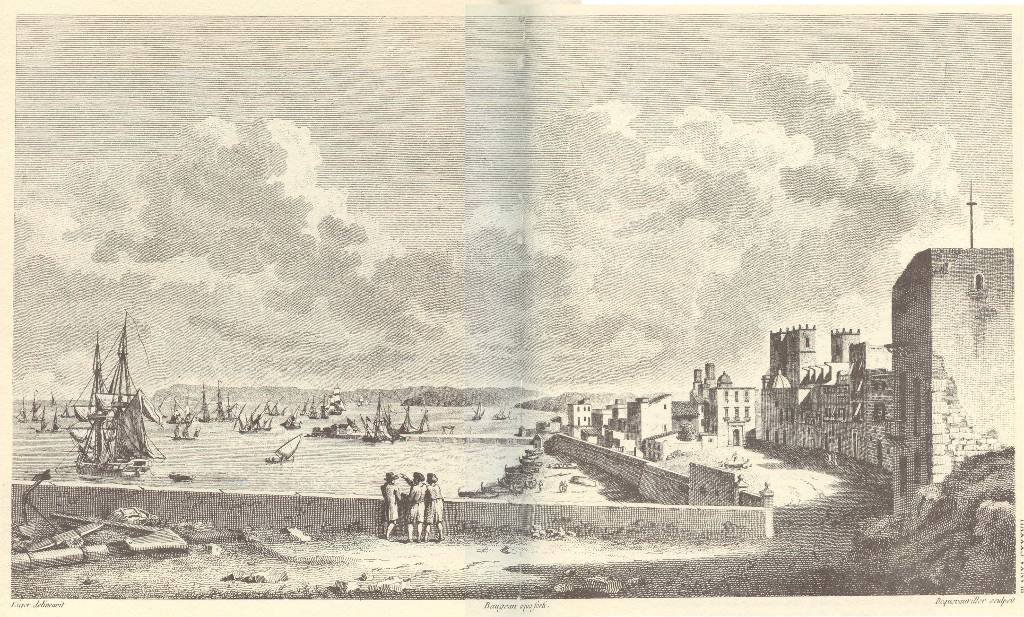
Alicante at the beginning of the 19th century

Alicante went into a long, slow decline that had begun in the 18th century and continued through the 19th century. The city's leather industry along with the production of agricultural products such as oranges and almonds, and its fishery allowed the city to survive economically. The end of the 19th century witnessed a sharp recovery of the local economy with increasing international trade and the growth of the city harbour leading to increased exports of several products (particularly during World War I when Spain was a neutral country).

During the early 20th century, Alicante was a minor capital which enjoyed the benefit of Spain's neutrality during the First World War, which provided new opportunities for industry and agriculture. The Moroccan war of the 1920s saw numerous alicantinos drafted to fight in the long and bloody campaigns at the former Spanish protectorate (Northern Morocco) against the Rif rebels. The political unrest of the late 1920s led to the victory of republican candidates in the local council elections throughout the country, and the abdication of King Alfonso XIII.

The proclamation of the Second Spanish Republic was much celebrated in the city on 14 April 1931. The Spanish Civil War broke out on 17 July 1936. Alicante was the last city loyal to the Republican government to be occupied by General Franco's troops on 1 April 1939, and its harbour saw the last Republican government officials flee the country. Even if not as famous as the bombing of Guernica by the German Luftwaffe, Alicante was the target of devastating air bombings during the three years of the civil war, most notably the bombing by the Italian Aviazione Legionaria of the Mercado Central de Alicante (Central Market of Alicante) on 25 May 1938 in which more than 300 civilians perished.

The next 20 years under Franco's dictatorship were difficult for Alicante as it was for the entire country. However, the late 1950s and early 1960s saw the onset of a lasting transformation of the city due to tourism. Large buildings and complexes rose in nearby Albufereta (e.g. El Barco) and Playa de San Juan, with the benign climate being the aspect of the city most attractive to prospective buyers and the tourists who kept local hotels reasonably busy.

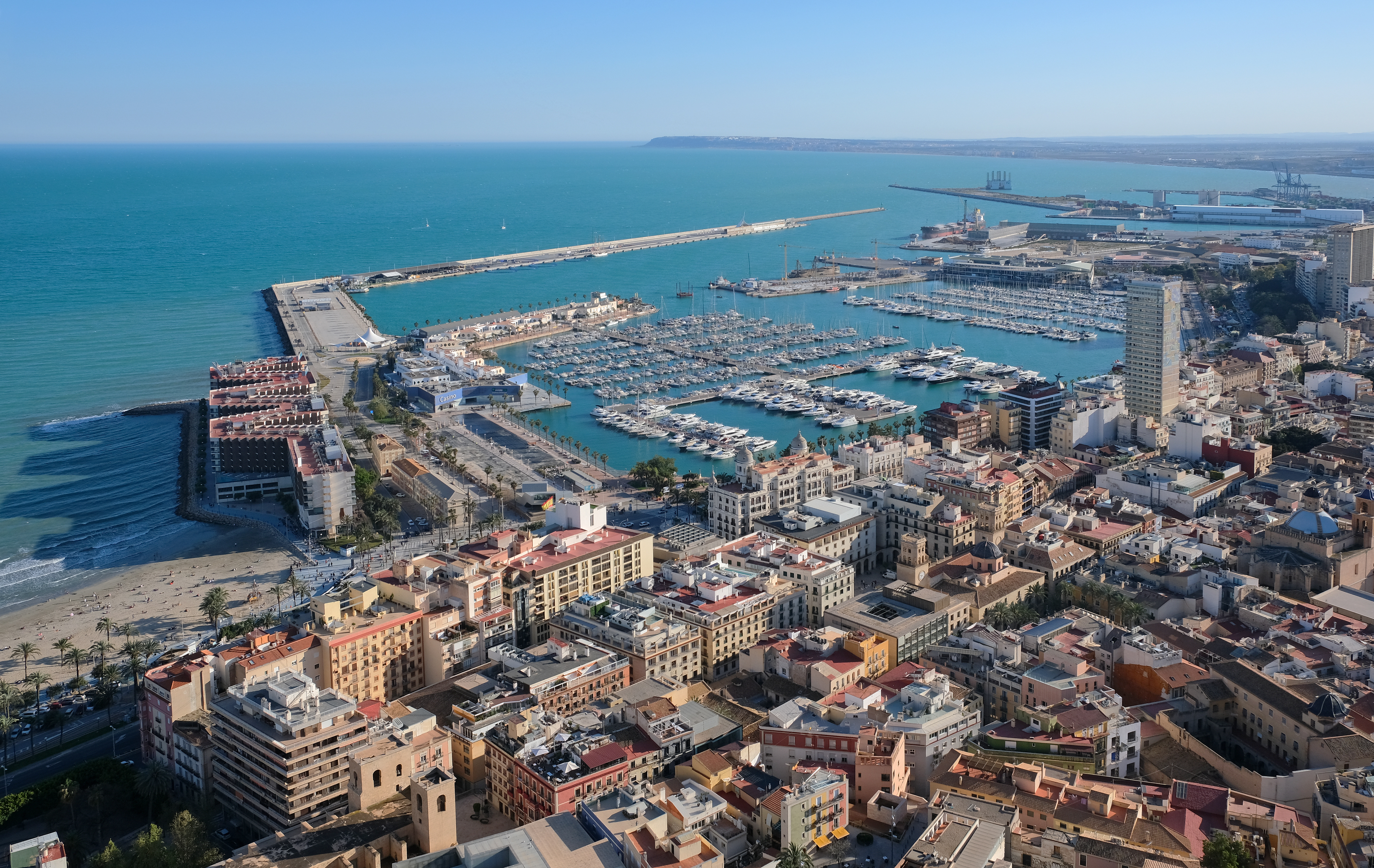
A view of Alicante from the Castillo de Santa Barbara.

The development of the tourism sector, aside from new construction, also attracted entrepreneurs who started numerous businesses such as restaurants, bars and other businesses focused on visitors. The old airfield at Rabasa was closed and air traffic moved to the new El Altet Airport, which made a convenient facility for the use of chartered flights bringing tourists from northern European countries.

When Francisco Franco died in 1975, his successor Juan Carlos I successfully oversaw the transition of Spain to a democratic constitutional monarchy. Governments of nationalities and regions were given more autonomy, and the Valencia region was permitted an autonomy it had not been allowed for four centuries.

Later notable landmarks have been the opening of the European Union Office for Harmonization in the Internal Market and the construction of the Ciudad de la Luz, a series of facilities meant to sponsor film industries in setting up operations at Alicante.

== See also ==
- Timeline of Alicante
