= La Escuera =

Ancient Iberian settlement

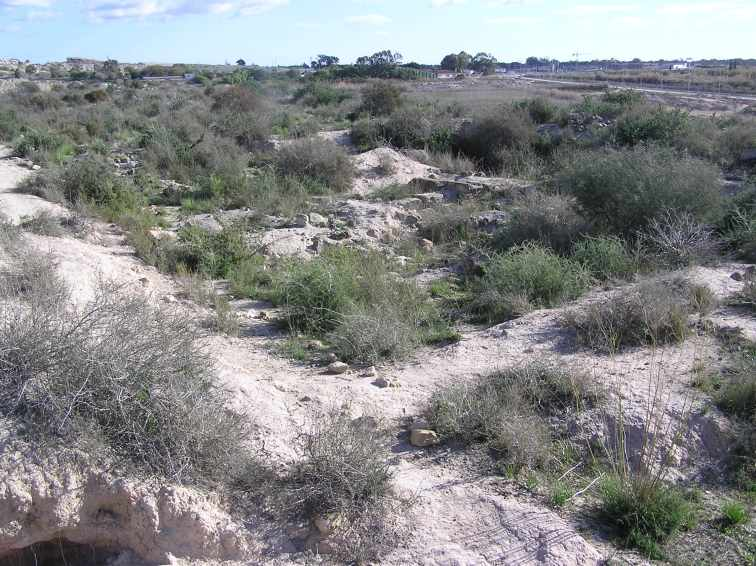

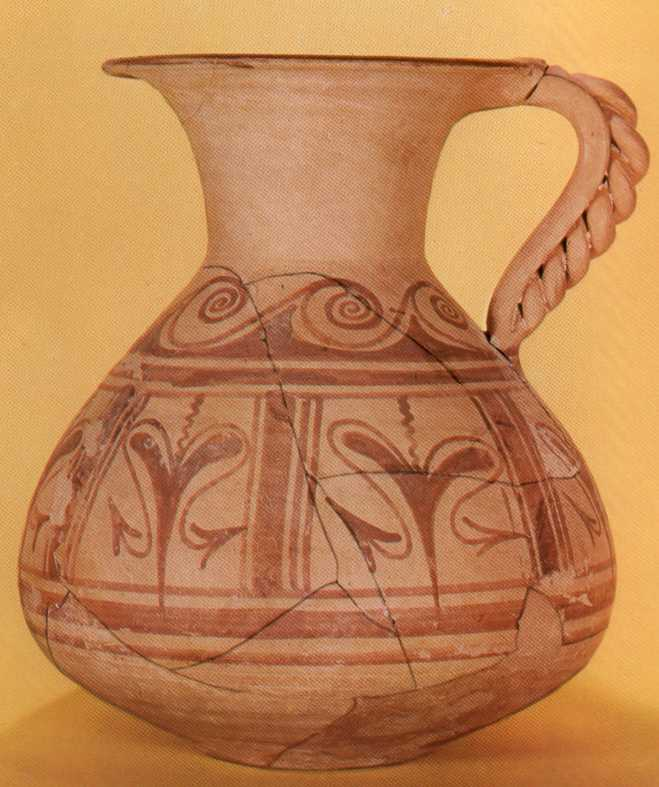

La Escuera is an early Iberian settlement located close to camino del Convenio in La Marina. It contains an Iberian temple sanctuary dating back to the third century BC, originally investigated by Swedish archaeologist Solveig Nordström in 1960.

== Excavation ==
On 9 July 2007 archaeological excavations were begun by students of archaeology of the University of Alicante, under the direction of D. Lorenzo Abad Casal, professor of archaeology, Dña. Feliciana Sala Sellés, teacher of archaeology and D. Jesus Moratalla Jávega, also a professor of archaeology from the University of Alicante. After Solveig Nordström's excavation of the La Escuera site in 1960 she wrote a book detailing her work.
