= Solveig Nordström =

Swedish archaeologist (1923–2021)

- Born: Solveig Nordström; 12 July 1923; Sweden
- Died: 21 January 2021 (aged 97)
- Education: Stockholm University (MA.Ph.)
- Occupation: Archeologist

Britt Solveig Maria Nordström (12 July 1923 – 21 January 2021) was a Swedish archeologist, who lived and worked in Spain since 1955.

== Early life ==
Nordstrom graduated from Stockholm University with a Masters of Philosophy in literary history in the early 1950s. She then studied Latin and Greek and became an archaeologist. In the 1950s, Italy and Greece were popular with Swedish archaeologists. But Nordstrom chose Spain and in 1955 was excavating the Alicante area for evidence of Phoenician trading posts.

== Career ==
Nordstrom cemented her place at the forefront of Spanish archaeology when in the 1960s, whilst studying for her doctorate (awarded in 1969 from the Stockholm University)she managed to stop excavators (by lying down in front of the machinery)from destroying the Tossal de Manises (Lucentum) site. Nordstrom notified the international press and managed to prevent the resumption of excavations for property development. This action stopped the property speculators from building on the remains of the Ibero-Romano city.

Due to this success, archaeologists were able to persuade the Spanish state to acquire the land, thereby avoiding any further building speculation. Manuel Olcina, director of the MARQ museum in Alicante, on which the Lucentum site depends, referred to Nordstrom as the 'dean of archaeology'. He also referred to the important work that Nordstrom conducted on decorated Iberian ceramics excavated from the Iberian town of San Fulgencio (La Escuera).

Erudite, polyglot (speaking 14 languages)and a translator (made all the more remarkable as Nordstrom had suffered from impaired hearing since she was a child). Olcina defined her as 'ahead of her time' and 'a very brave and forward thinking woman' - especially in Spain. As an archaeologist she was convinced of the presence of the Cartheginians in the Levante area. Here she was following in the wake of her mentor and teacher - Jose Lafuente Vidal. Nordstrom affirmed reluctantly that she had retired too soon - but had left important work. What she liked most in life was work and she did so up to the last moments of her life. This was confirmed by her friend and collaborator - Teresa Laroccha, who had been with Solveig a few days before her death to help her with her last article - about the goddess Tanet - she did not want to leave the article half completed

== Personal life and awards ==
Nordstrom lived her whole life in Benidorm on the north Costa Blanca coast. She was one of the pioneers of teaching yoga classes in the city. This at a time when Spain was living under the Franco regime with customs far removed from her native Sweden. Solveig was also a founding member of the Centro Espirita Ana Franco in Benidorm.

Ahead of International Women's Day in 2011, the Parque de la Solveig Nordstrom, in Alicante was inaugurated. In 2016, a further tribute was paid to Nordstrom by the naming of a 'ninot' after her ( one of the huge 'carton piedra) sculptures produced for the annual 'Hoguera de Sant Juan' held in Alicante.

== Lucentum ==
In 1955, she prevented the destruction of the archeological remains of an ancient Roman city located in Alicante by lying on the ground in front of the bulldozer that had been brought in to level the ground to make way for a new hotel complex. Her bravery was reported worldwide and this site is now confirmed to be the ancient Roman city of Lucentum. Her endeavour culminated in the “Lucentum” site being designated in 1961 as an "Artistic and Historic Monument", which then afforded it some legal protection.

== La Escuera ==
La Escuera contains an Iberian temple sanctuary dating back to the third century BC, originally investigated by Solveig Nordström in 1960. After her excavation of the La Escuera site in 1960 she wrote a book detailing her work.
