= Mount Benacantil =

Mountain in Alicante, Spain

Benacantil
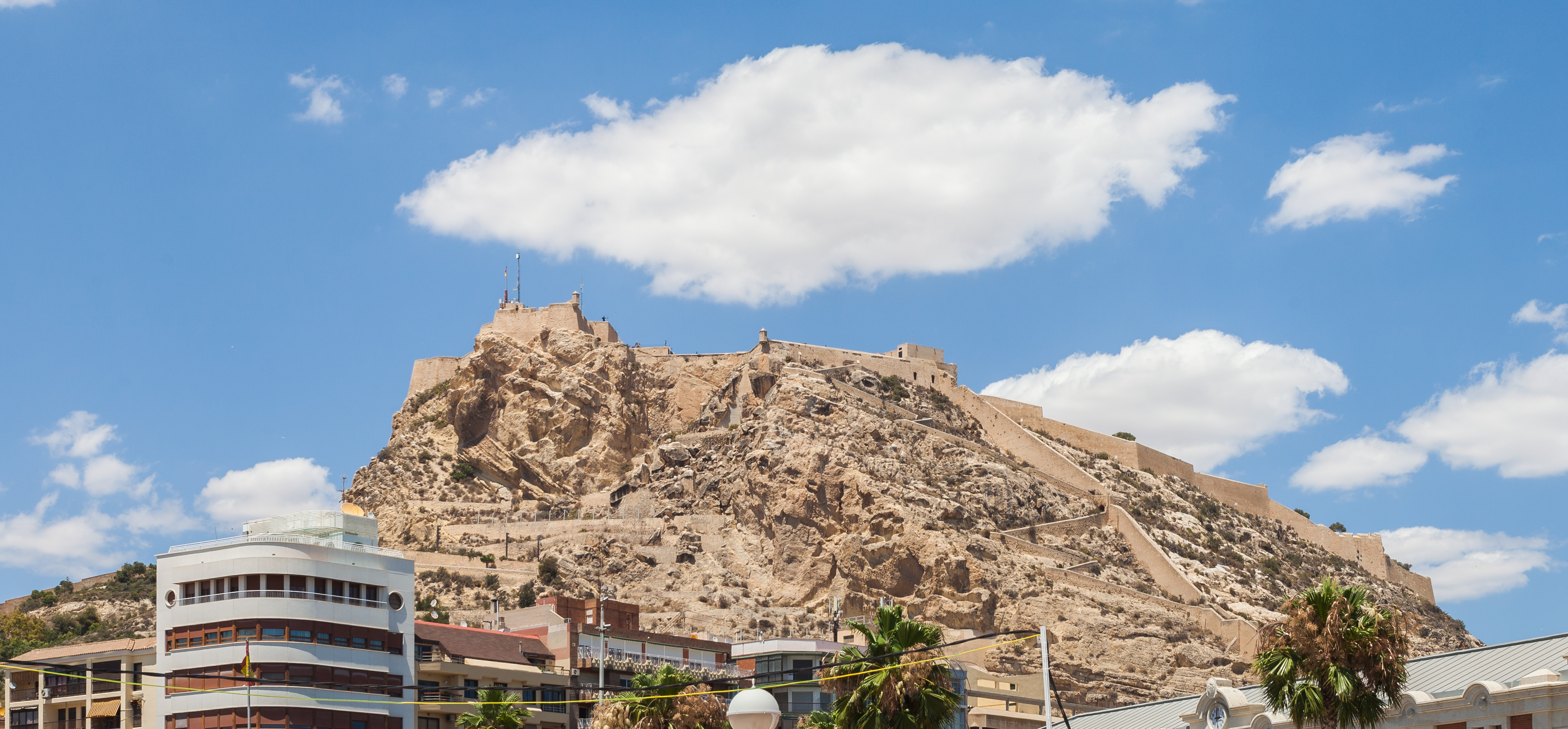
- Mount Benacantil with the Castle of Santa Bárbara.

Highest point
- Elevation: 169 m (554 ft)
- Prominence: 127 m (417 ft)
- Coordinates: 38°21′00″N 00°28′41″W

Geography
- Location within Spain
- Location: Alicante, Spain
- Parent range: Sistemas Prebéticos

Climbing
- First ascent: Bronze Age

Mount Benacantil (Valencian: [benakanˈtil]; Spanish: [benakanˈtil]) is a mount (or rather a large hill) that dominates the urban part of Alicante, and is the characteristic image of the city. The mount name appears as Banu-l-Qatil in the work of Muslim geographer Al-Idrisi in the 12th century, but it is possible that this is an error of transcription (Arab names like beni are abundant on the peninsula; the name means "family tree") because it does not make sense in Arabic (it would be "the family of the murderer"). Compared with other names in the Valencian Community, the mount name is more likely to be derived from the word benna, an Arabic transcription of pinna, which is "rock" in Latin; combined with the adjective laqanti, which comes from Laqant, the Arabic name of the city. Therefore, a half Roman, half Arabic toponym, Benna Laqanti.

The rock mount is covered by pine trees and bushes on the north side, while on the south side, which overlooks the Mediterranean Sea, there are only rocks. In the intermediate areas there are bushes and grasses that are quite characteristic for the dry Mediterranean climate.

The mount is famous for the rock formation on its south-western slope, known as la cara del moro ("the moor's face").^{(view image)}

The medieval fortress of Alicante, the Castle of Santa Bárbara stands on the top of the mount. On its slopes there are Ereta Park, the neighborhoods of Santa Cruz, San Roque, San Anton and Raval Roig, and antique apartments. In recent years it has become a botellón, or place where young people congregate to socialize while drinking alcohol.

Avenida Jaime II, which is a continuation of Avenida de Alfonso el Sabio, crosses the northern foot of the mount, and so does a tunnel of Alicante Tram.
