= Alicante Tram =

Railway system in Alicante, Spain

Coordinates: 38°21′55″N 0°26′40″W

Alicante Metropolitan TRAM TRAM Metropolità d'Alacant (Valencian) TRAM Metropolitano de Alicante (Spanish)

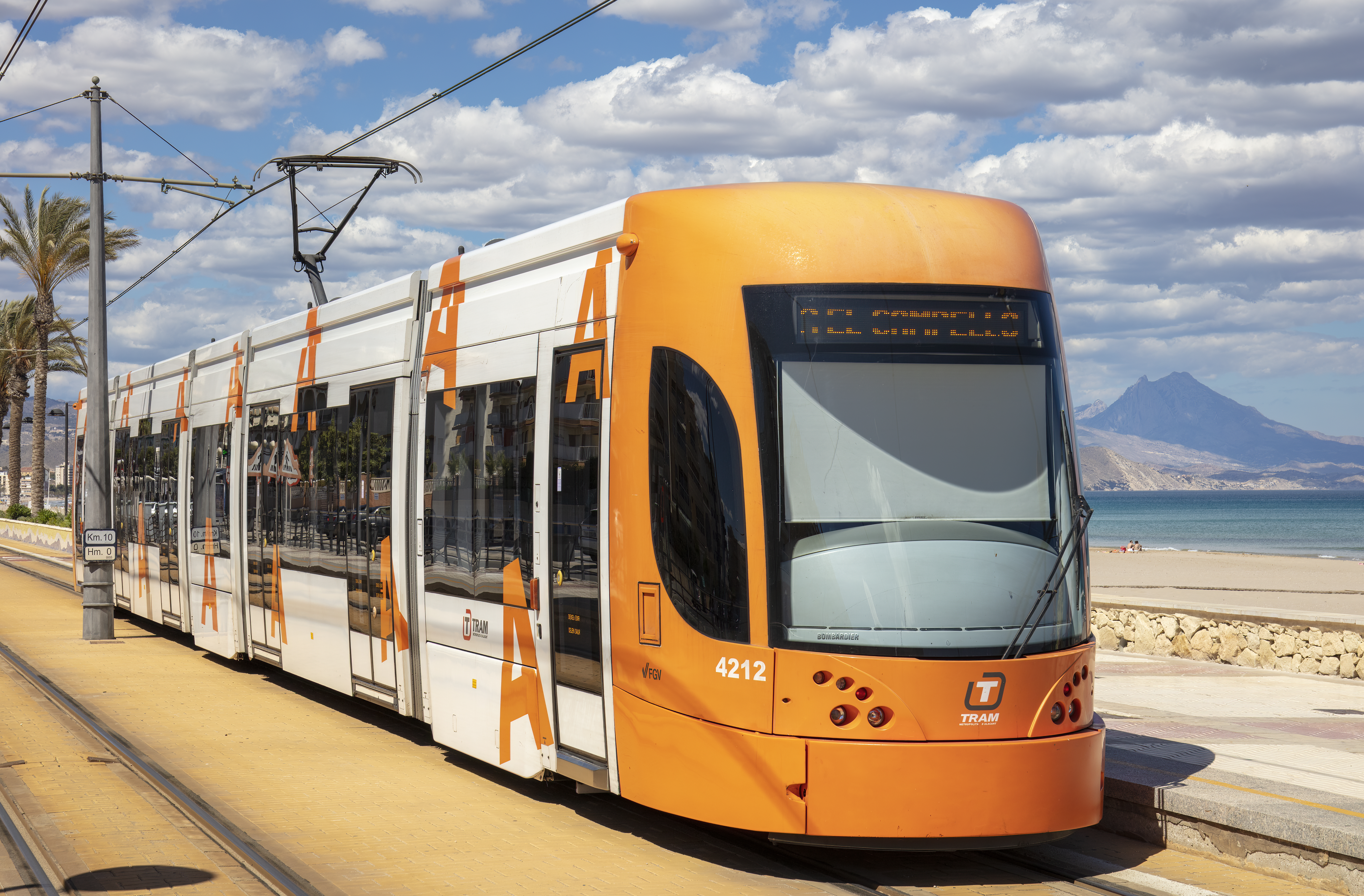
- Tram close to Muchavista Beach.

Overview
- Locale: Alicante, Valencian Community (Spain)
- Transit type: Tram; Light rail Tram-train; Commuter rail
- Number of lines: 6
- Number of stations: 71
- Daily ridership: 55,500 (2024)
- Annual ridership: 20,267,803 (2024)
- Website: www.tramalicante.es

Operation
- Began operation: 1999
- Operator: FGV

Technical
- System length: 111.708 km (69.412 mi)
- Track gauge: 1,000 mm (3 ft 3 3/8 in)
- Electrification: Overhead line, 750 V DC
Metropolitan area rate
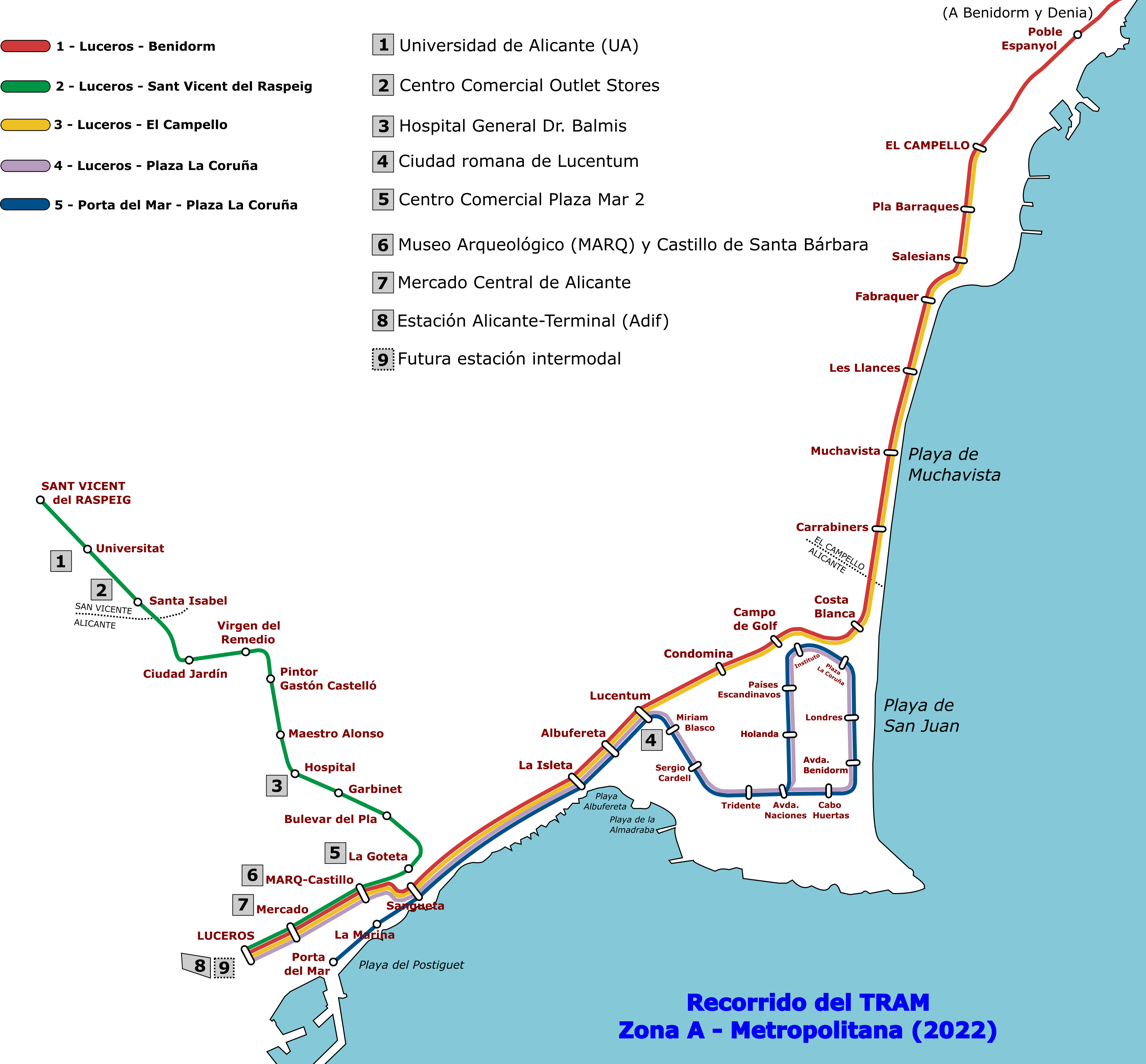

The Alicante Tram, trademarked as Alicante Metropolitan TRAM (Valencian: TRAM Metropolità d'Alacant, Spanish: TRAM Metropolitano de Alicante), (Note: Pronunciation: Valencian: [ˈtɾam metɾopoliˈta ðalaˈkant].; Spanish: [ˈtɾam metɾopoliˈtano ðe aliˈkante].) (Note: Local nicknames: El Tram (Valencian: [el ˈtɾam], Spanish: [el ˈtɾan]), "The Tram".) is a rail transport network operating in the city of Alicante (Alacant), and its surrounding area, in the Valencian Community of Spain. It was inaugurated on 15 August 2003 replacing narrow-gauge diesel trains between Alicante and El Campello.

Like other narrow gauge railways in the Valencian Community, it is run by Ferrocarrils de la Generalitat Valenciana (FGV). The Alicante Metropolitan Tram network combines different modes of rail services: a partially underground light rail through Alicante city centre, a tram-train from Alicante to Benidorm, and conventional commuter rail from Benidorm to Altea, Calpe (Calp) and Dénia.

== History ==
There has been a long history of urban rail service in Alicante. The tram service began on 13 July 1893 and the network was rapidly expanded to Mutxamel (1902), Elche (Elx) and Crevillent (1905) and Sant Vicent del Raspeig (1906). Initially, the streetcars were horse-drawn. From 1903 the trams were powered by steam engines, leading to the disappearance of the horse-drawn trams by 1924. The electrification of tram lines began in 1923. In the 1920s and 30s the network was further expanded throughout the city and was extensively used in the 1940s. In the 1950s, due to the high cost of electricity, trams were gradually losing the competition against growing automobile services and by 14 November 1969 they completely disappeared from the streets. Thirty years later, on 13 March 1999 the trams returned with the inauguration of an experimental route between Plaza del Mar and Albufereta that was extended to El Campello in 2003.

== Lines ==
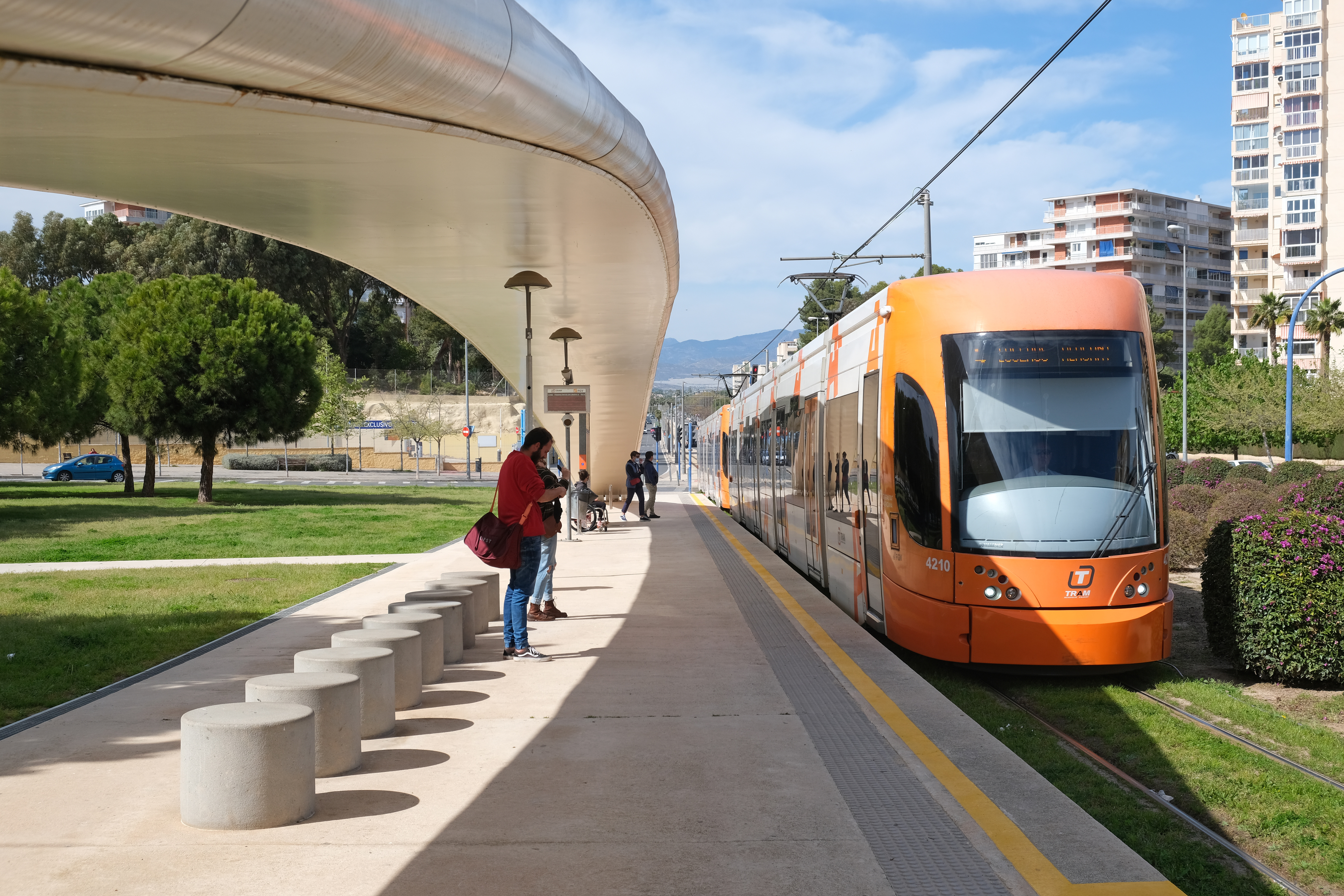
Tram at Holanda station on line L4

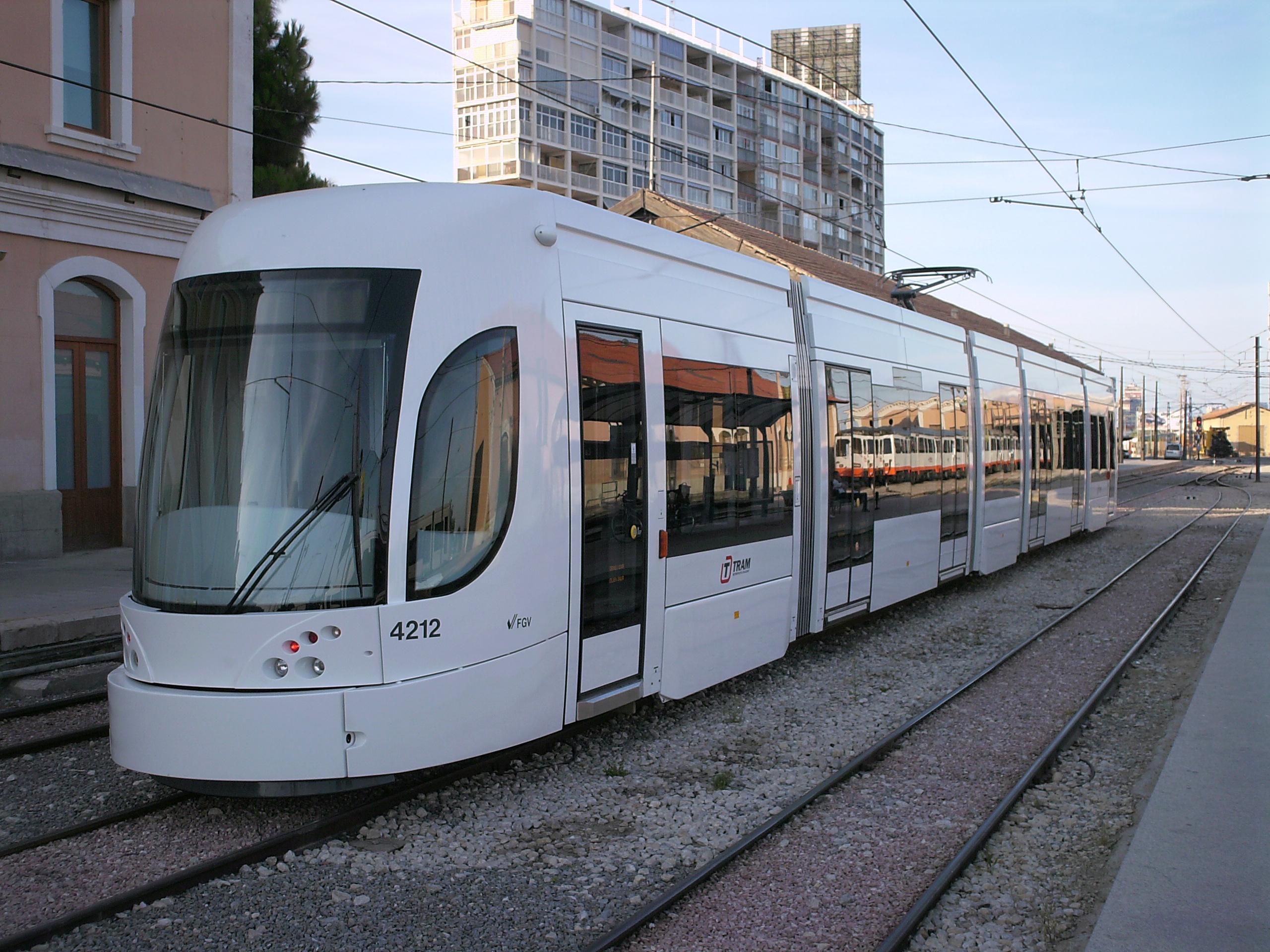
Flexity Outlook type tram at the station Alicante - La Marina

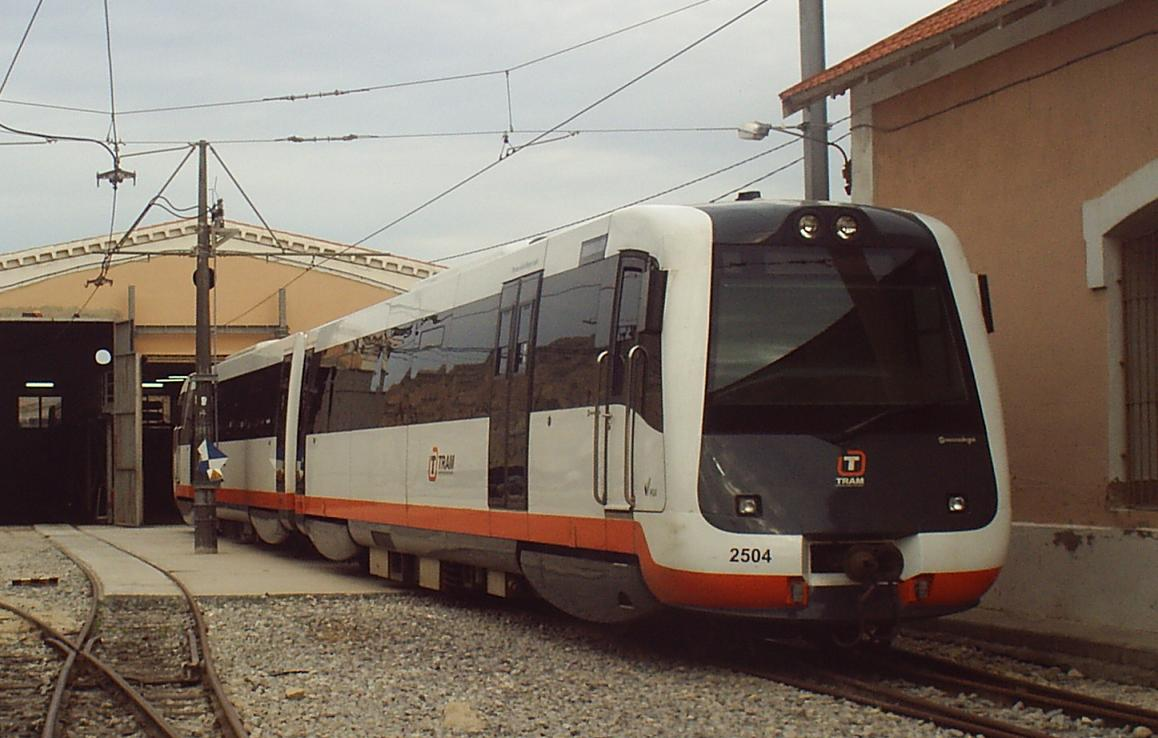
New MAN 2500 series diesel train at depot near La Marina station

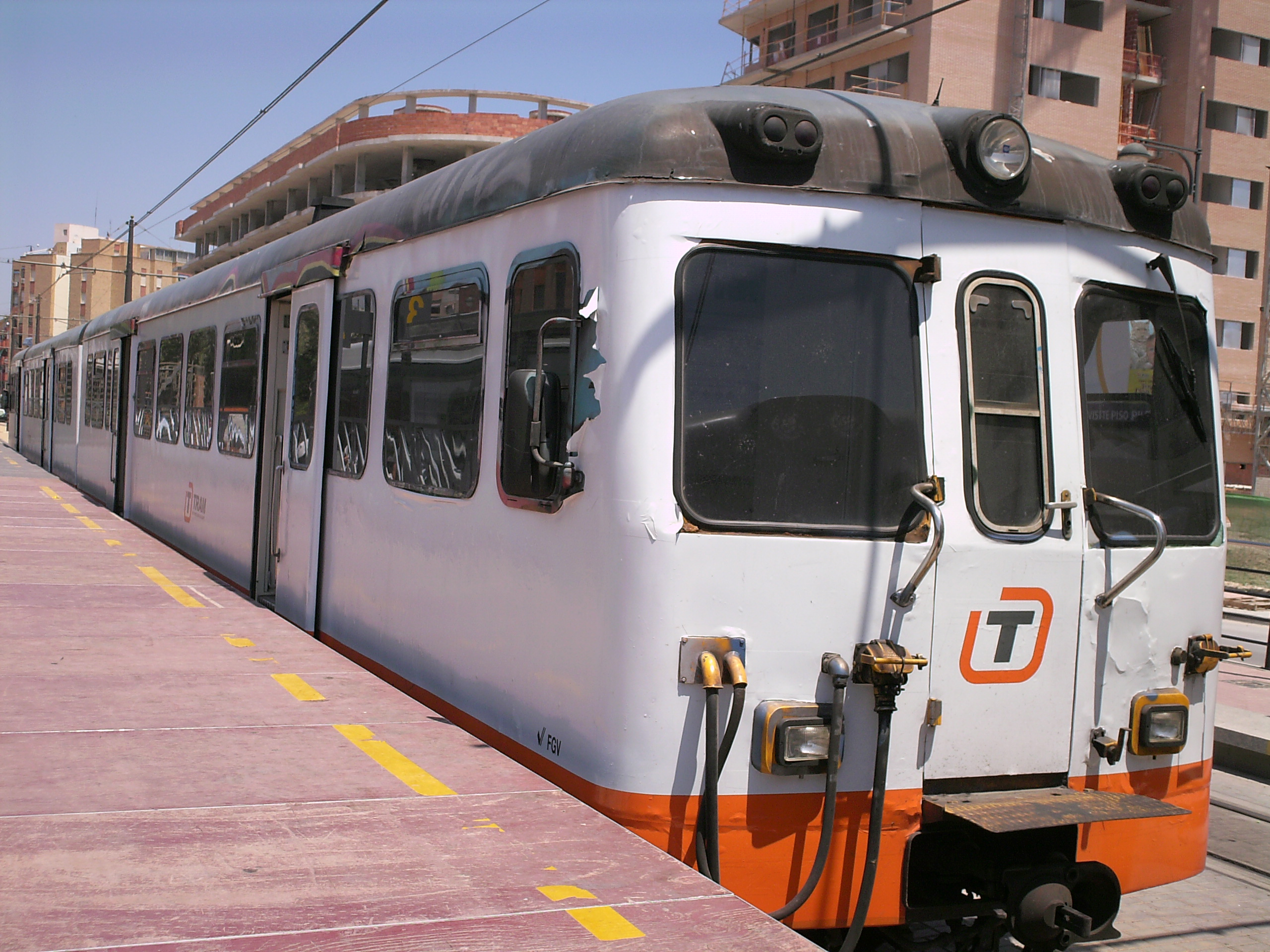
Old MAN 2300 series diesel train in El Campello station

The network comprises the following lines:

Line	Terminals	Year opened	Service type	Length	Stations	Passengers in 2024
	Luceros – Benidorm	2007	Tram-train	44.569 km (27.694 mi)	20	4,207,050
	Luceros – Sant Vicent del Raspeig	2013	Tram	7.207 km (4.478 mi)	14	8,187,254
	Luceros – El Campello	2003^{†}	Tram-train	14.404 km (8.950 mi)	17	3,283,776
	Luceros – Pl. La Coruña	2007	Tram	14.609 km (9.078 mi)	18	1,535,871
	Puerta/Porta del Mar - Sangueta (Lanzadera Puerta del Mar / Llançadora Porta del Mar)	1999 - 2013	Tram	1.359 km (0.844 mi)	3	2,372,870
	Puerta/Porta del Mar – Pl. La Coruña	2019	Tram	13.285 km (8.255 mi)	17	1,162,324
	Benidorm – Dénia	1987^{†}	Regional train	50.856 km (31.600 mi)	18	1,129,470

^{†} Notes: What is now L3 was opened initially in 1999 as an experimental service between Puerta/Porta del Mar and Albufereta, and was extended to El Campello in 2003. 4L no longer operates as of 2013 and instead has had its service replaced by L5. L9 was originally taken over by FGV in 1987, and was incorporated into the tram network upon its opening.

=== L1 ===
L1 is a limited-stop service from Alicante city centre to Benidorm taking 70 minutes journey time. In Benidorm, it connects with line L9 to Denia.

=== L2 ===
L2 starts from the city centre to the shopping center Plaza Mar 2, the General Hospital of Alicante, the University of Alicante and Sant Vicent del Raspeig, with a journey time of 28 minutes.

=== L3 ===
L3 is a stopping service from Alicante to El Campello.

=== L4 ===
L4 runs from the city centre to a loop in Playa de San Juan (Platja de Sant Joan) district.

=== 4L ===
4L ran from Puerta/Porta del Mar to Sangueta. The section is now replaced by the longer L5 that additionally runs through the shared L4 loop though the Playa de San Juan (Platja de Sant Joan). 4L was previously an extension of the old L1 built to facilitate passengers to the core of the city but due to the diversion of all lines through the urban tunnel to Luceros, the tracks were connected to the new diversions and established as 4L (Puerta/Porta del Mar - Sangueta | Lanzadera Puerta del Mar / Llançadora Porta del Mar), later closing in 2013 but reopening as a part of the then new L5.

=== L5 ===
L5 starts at Puerta/Porta del Mar to Sangueta, then following the L4 loop in Playa de San Juan (Platja de Sant Joan) district. It was opened in 2019, using former alignment from Puerta/Porta del Mar and Sangueta that was used prior to the opening of the city centre tunnel to Luceros.

=== L9 ===
L9 is diesel powered commuter rail service from Benidorm along the coast to Dénia, stopping at other important tourist towns like Altea and Calpe (Calp). Services are subject to disruption due to engineering works as the line is prepared for electrification.

=== Shared Central Section ===
Lines L1, L2, L3 and L4 share the city centre underground section between MARQ and the city centre Luceros station. The Mercado station on the segment was opened on 10 May 2007 and the Luceros was opened on 18 June 2010.

== Utilisation ==
In 2022, the network served more than 13 million passengers. The busiest stations were Luceros (2,110,810 passengers), Mercado (1,367,514), Benidorm (731,051), Sant Vicent del Raspeig (686,983) and El Campello (540,622).

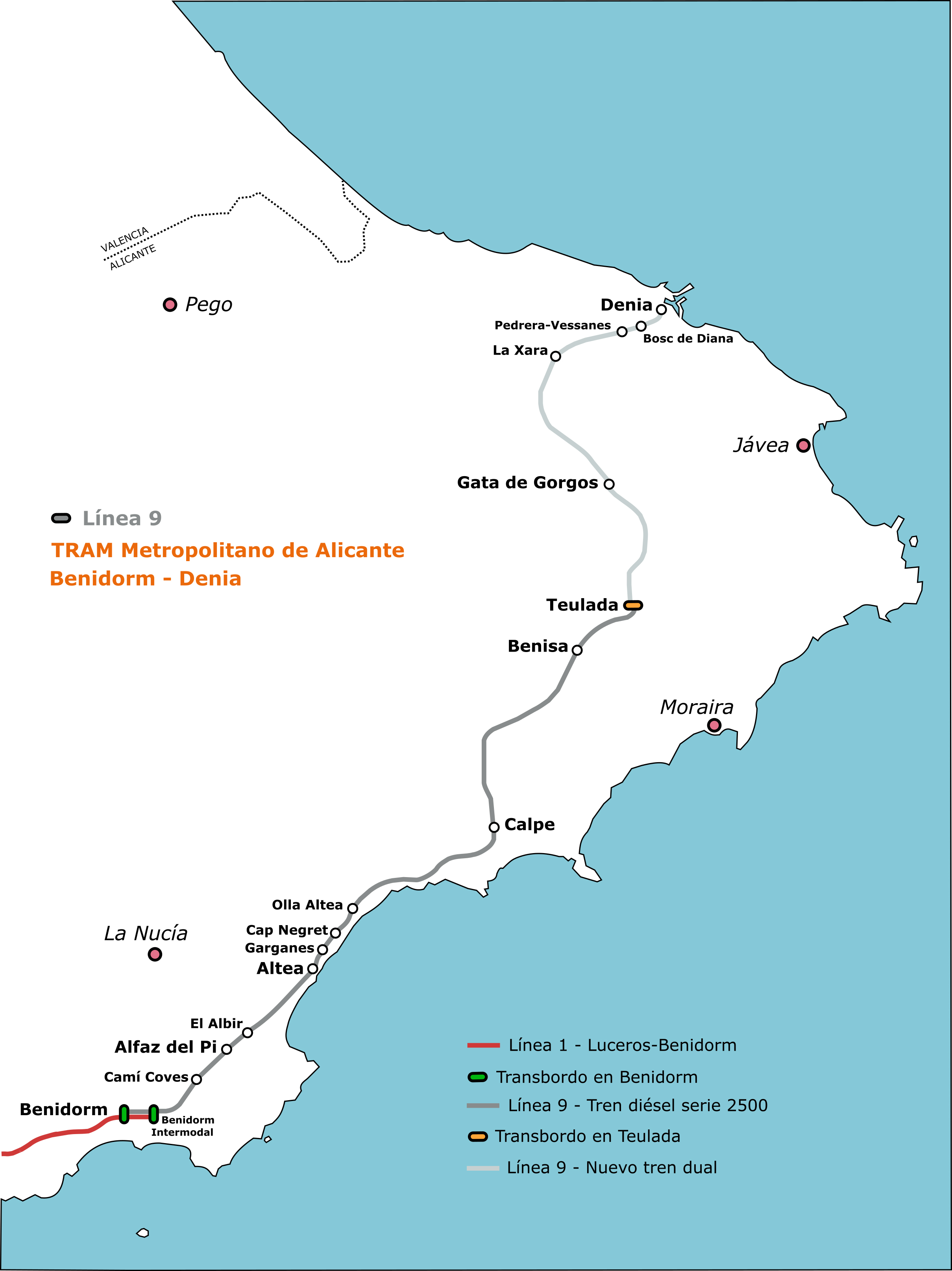
Line 9 route in 2023

== Future expansion ==
The underground section is planned to continue westward to Estación Multimodal (Estació Multimodal) serving the Adif station (and a possible relocation of the bus station). This was originally delayed, but in April 2022 President of the Valencian Government Ximo Puig committed funds to progress this extension.

On the other hand, there are plans to extend the tram-train service in different places:

- New Line 6, from Estación Intermodal (Estació Multimodal) to Hospital of Sant Vicent del Raspeig, while giving service to neighborhoods such as San Blas (Sant Blai) and San Agustín (Sant Agustí)
- New line to the neighborhoods in the south of the city such as La Florida and Sant Gabriel
- New line to the Hospital of San Juan (Sant Joan), Benimagrell, San Juan pueblo (Sant Joan poble) and Muchamiel (Mutxamel)
- New line between Torrevieja and Orihuela
- New line between Elche (Elx) and the Aeropuerto (Aeroport)

== Gallery ==
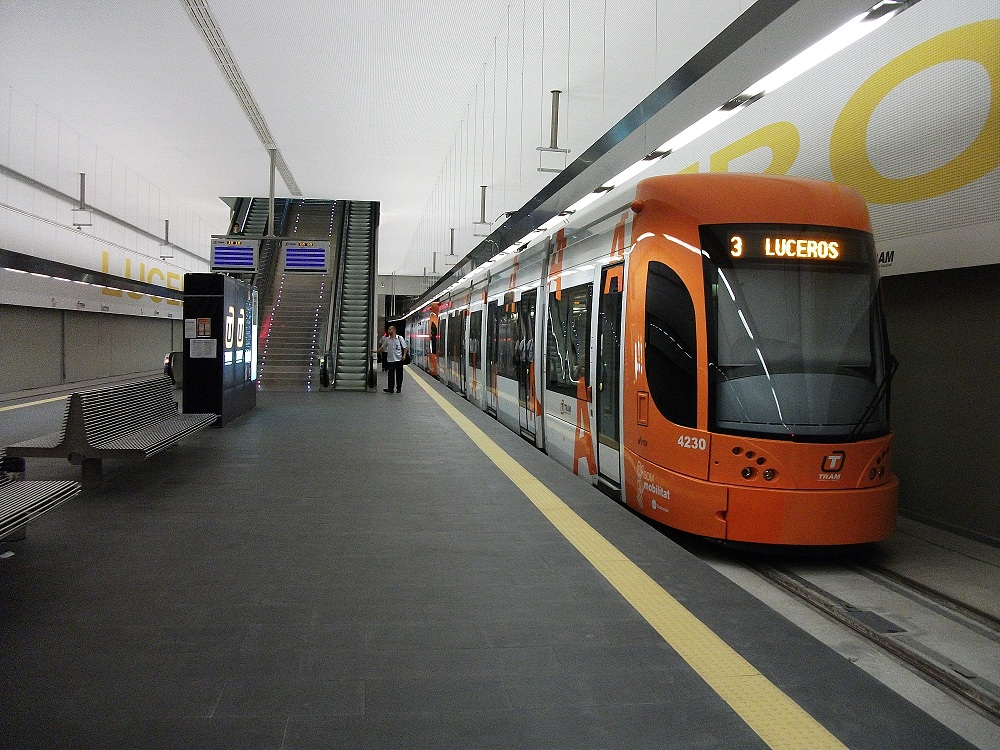

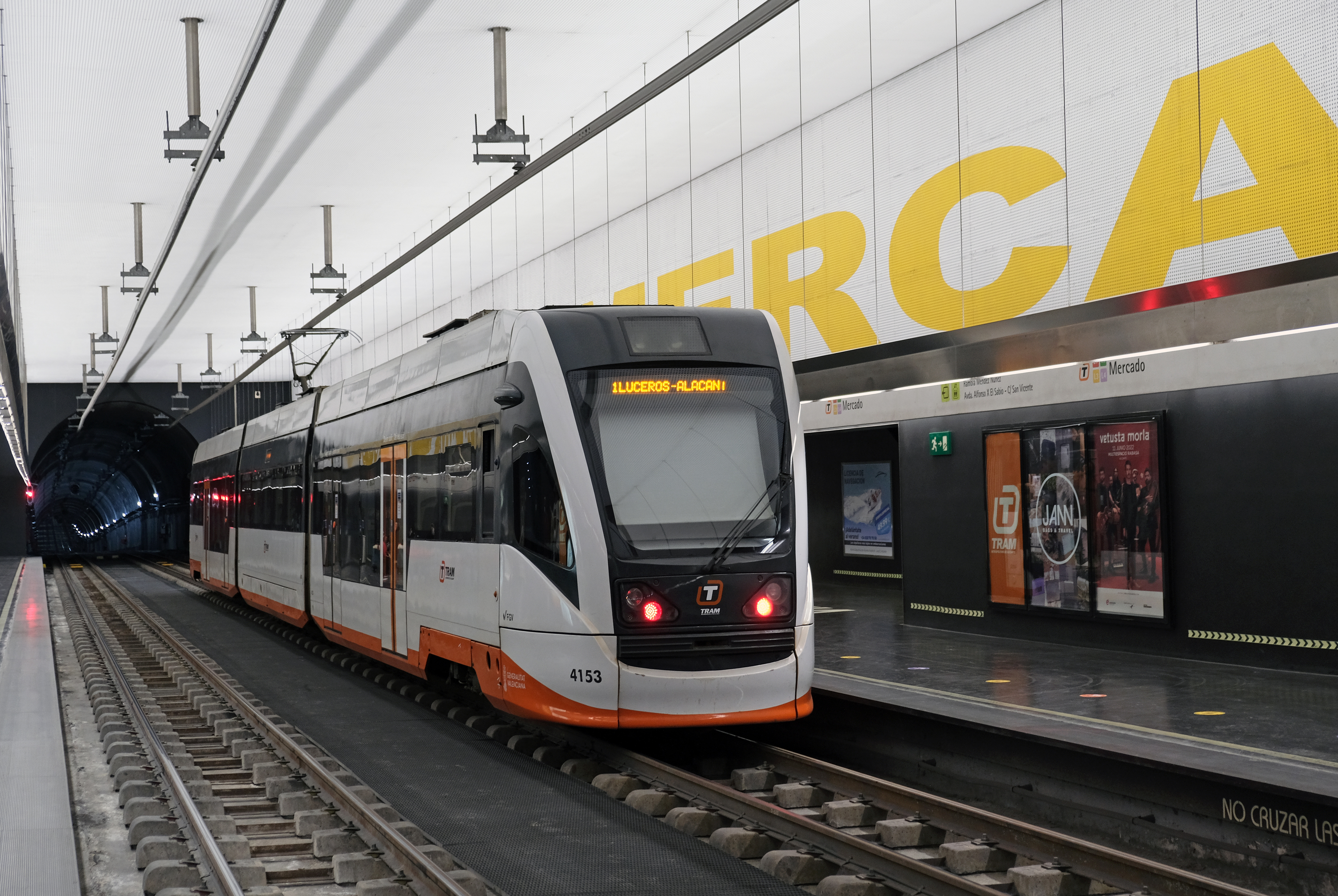

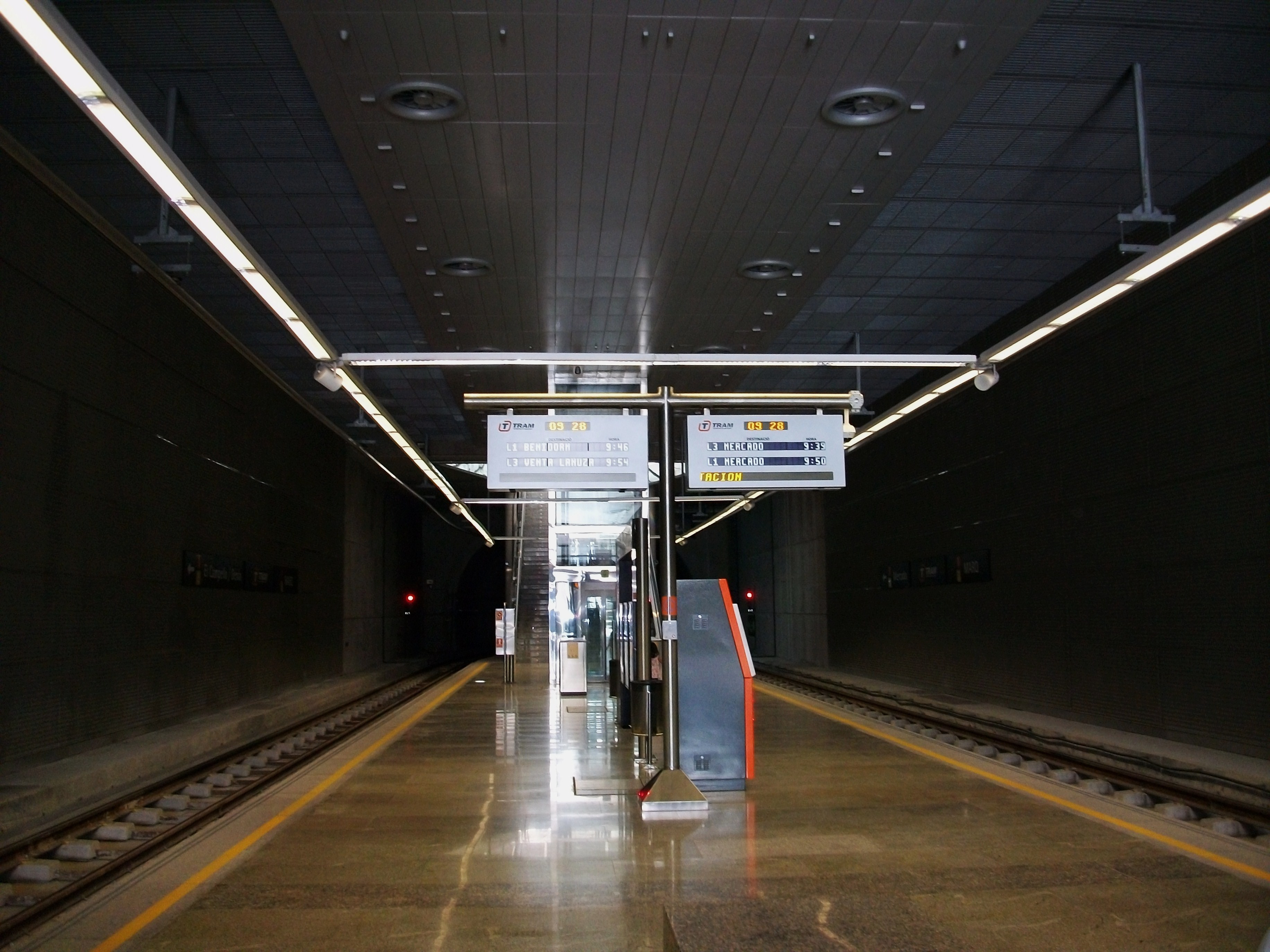

Underground stations

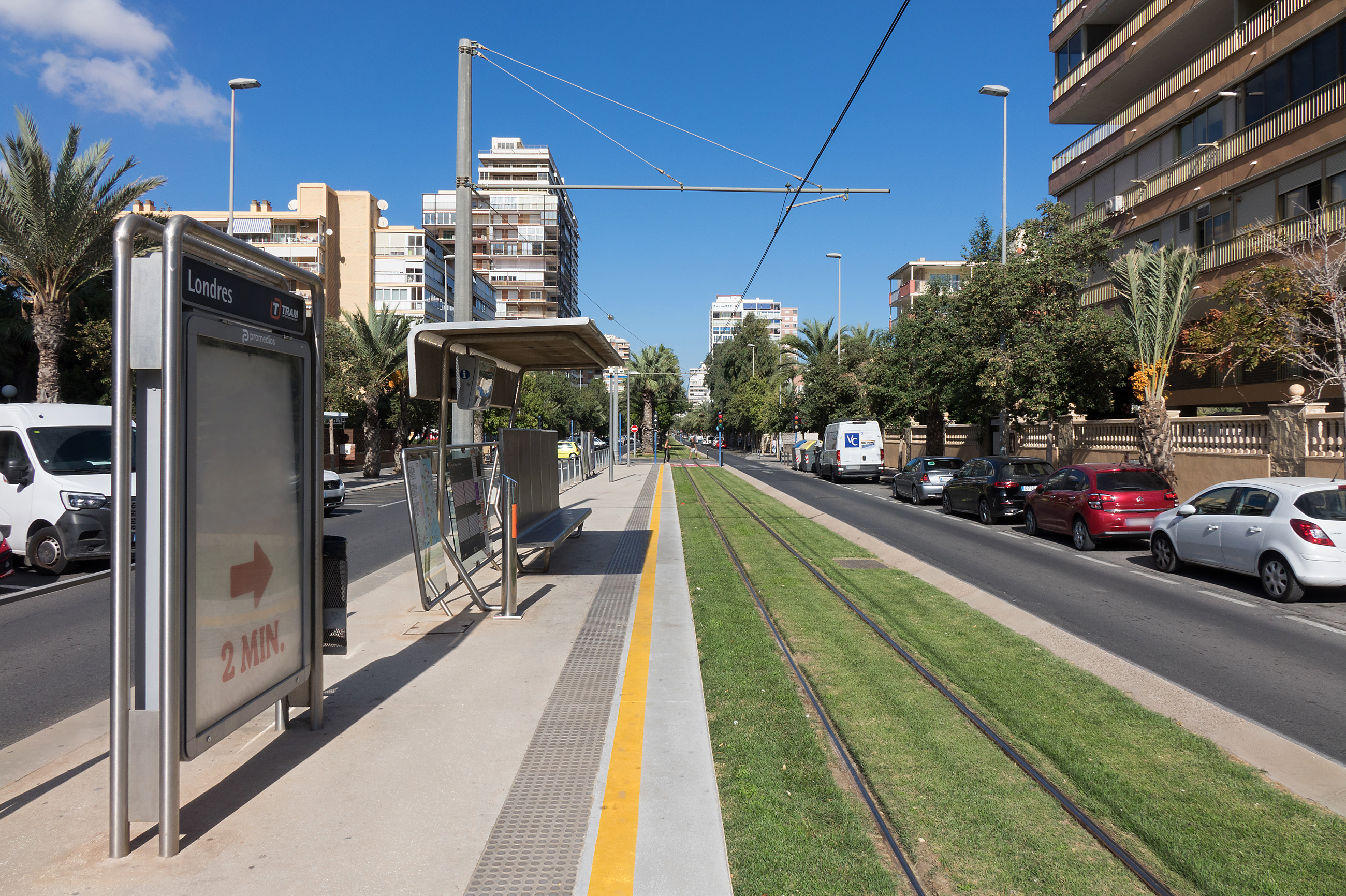

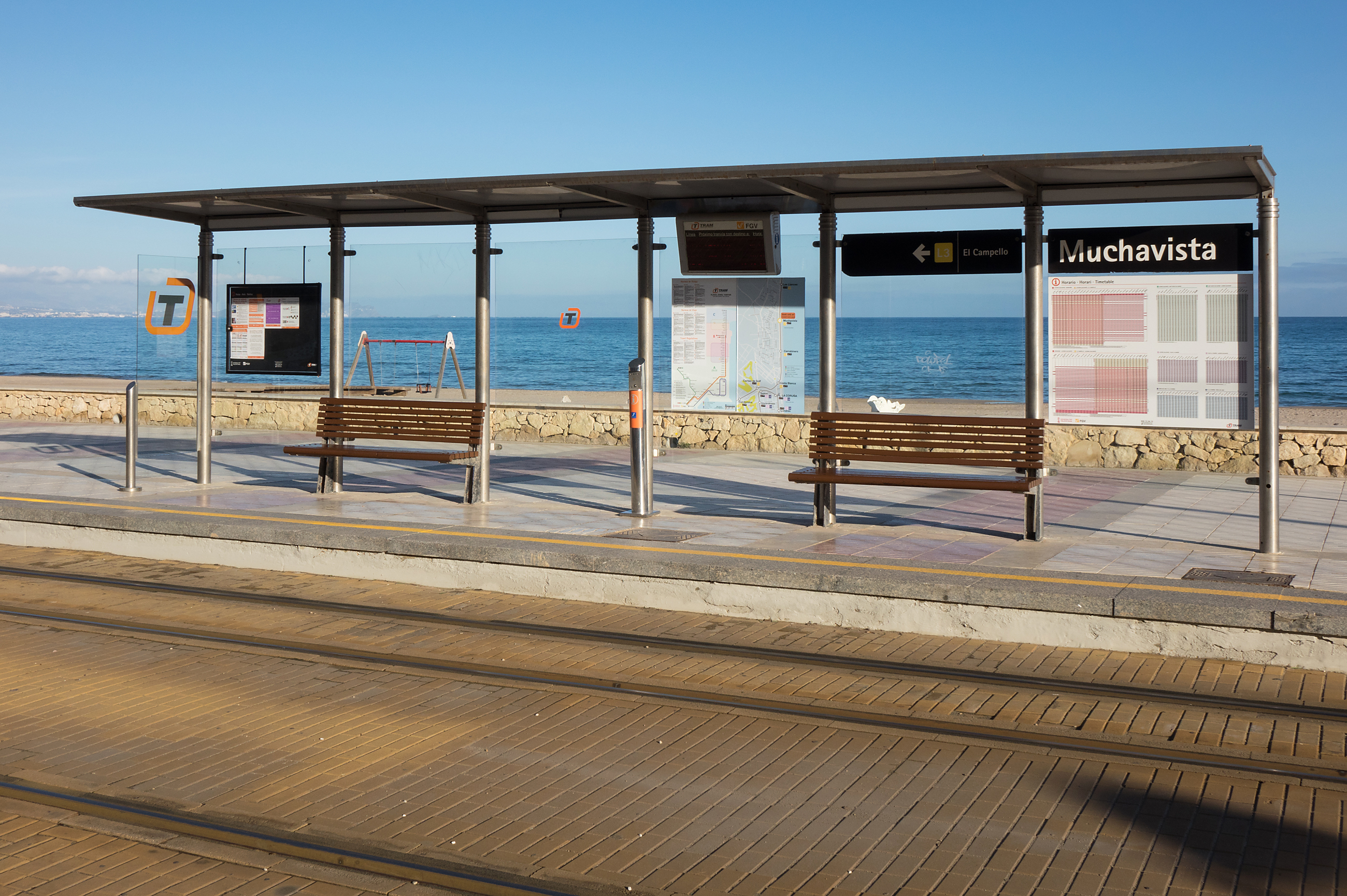

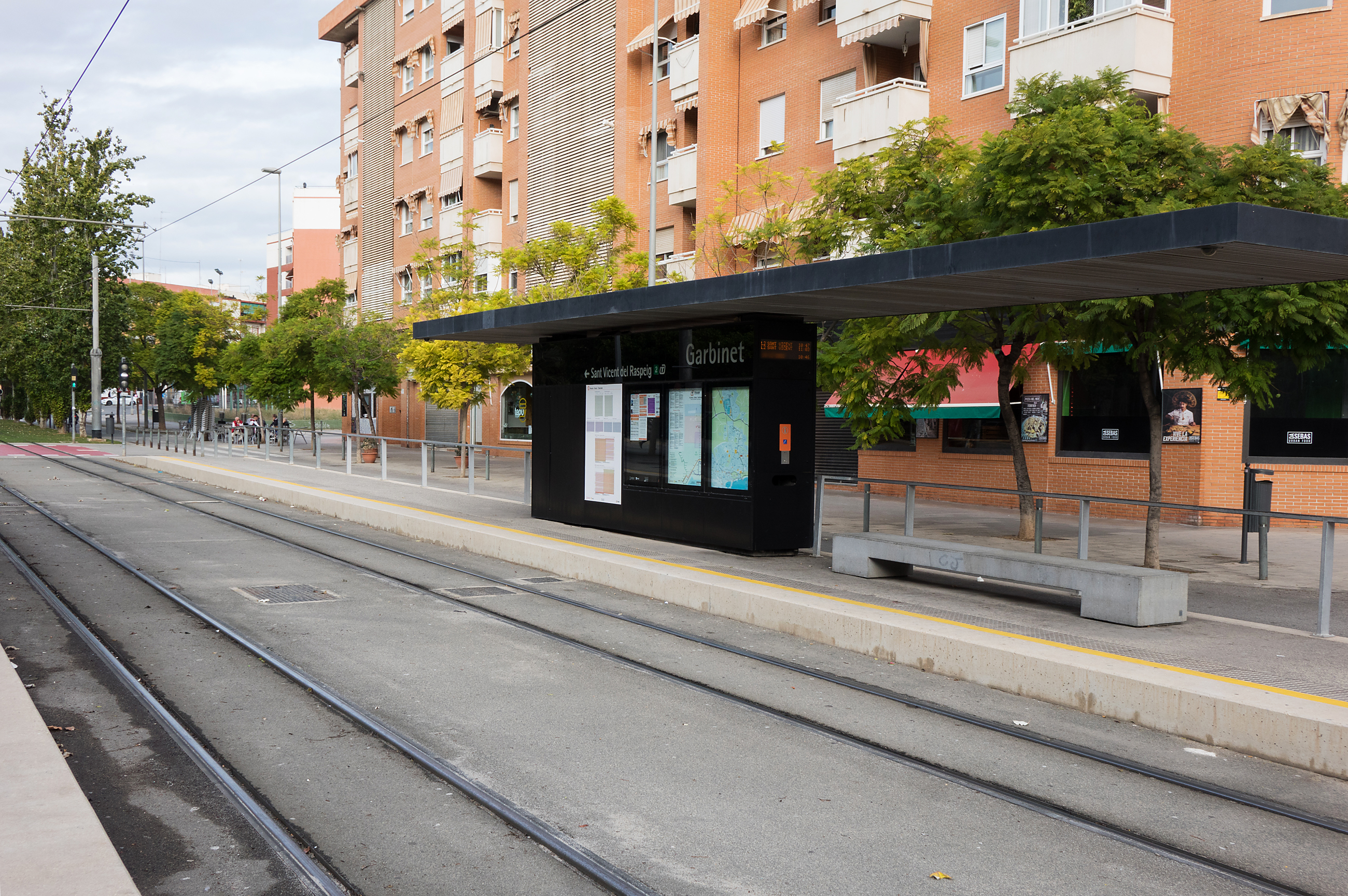

Ground stations
