= Ciudad de la Luz =

Spanish film studio

Coordinates: 38.308943°N 0.529347°W

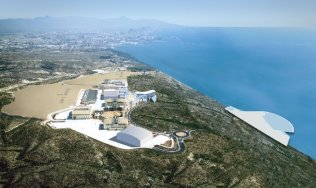
Aerial view of Ciudad de la Luz

Ciudad de la Luz ("City of Light") is a film studio in Alicante, Spain. About 60 films were shot on the studio's premises between opening in 2005 and closing in 2012. In May 2012, the European Commission ruled that public subsidies received by the studio from the local government violated European competition law and ordered Ciudad de la Luz to pay back €265 million. The studio was shut down in October 2012 in preparation for its sale. In 2009 there was a project to shoot a film with Tim Roth called King Conqueror in whose cast was included Thomas Kretcheman, Juan Diego Botto, Gabino Diego, Violante Placido and Kata Dobó, however this film was never made due to economic problems.

However, in the end the government decided to keep ownership of the facilities, using them for various purposes such as COVID vaccination and space for digital startups. In March 2022, the EU lifted the restrictions and permitted the complex to resume cinematographic activities from July 1st, 2022 onwards. Plans include a possible hosting of a sub-headquarters of Euronews.
