= Archaeological Museum of Alicante =

- Museo Arqueológico Provincial de Alicante Museu Arqueològic Provincial d'Alacant
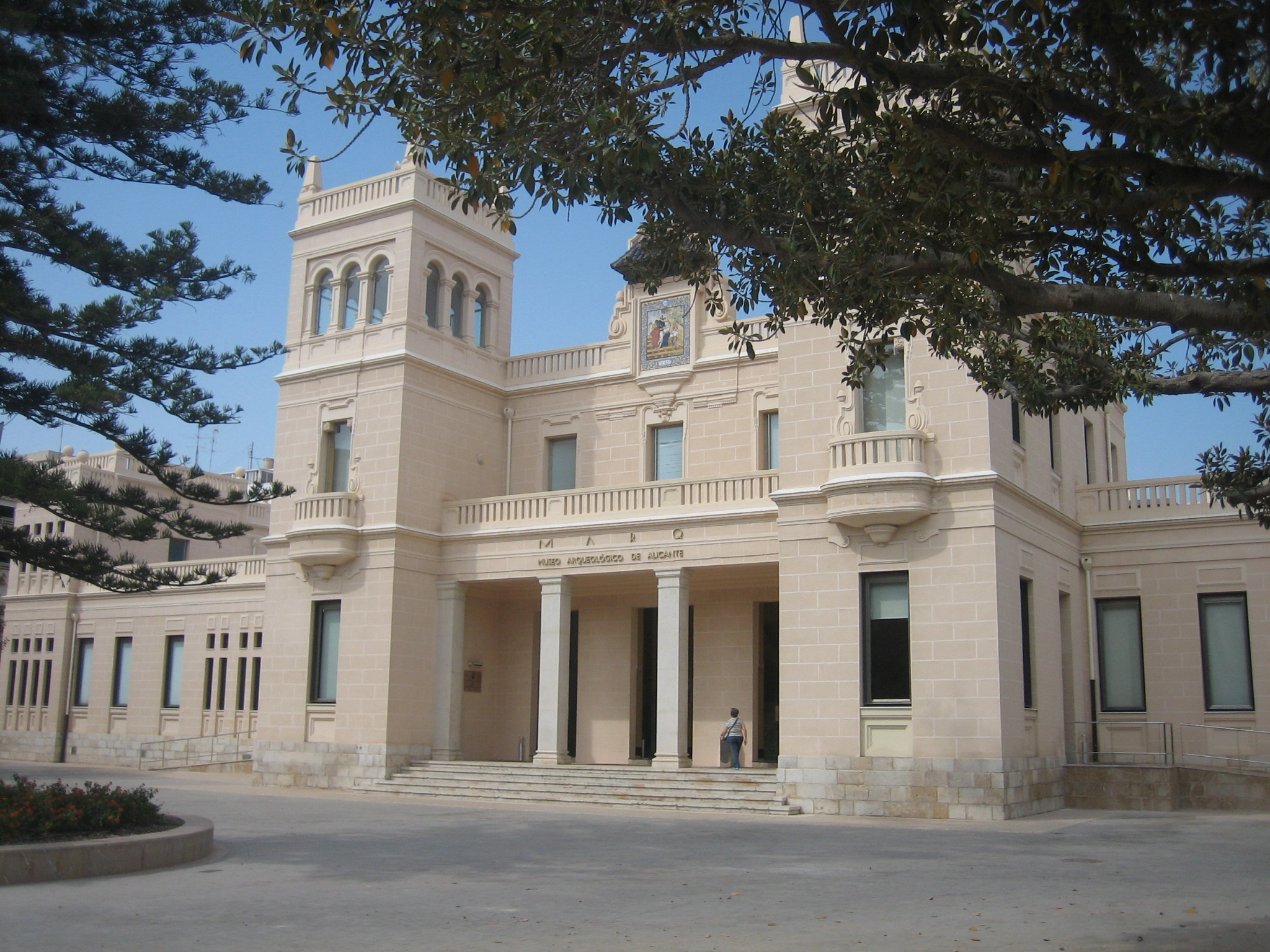
- Facade of the Archaeological Museum
- Interactive fullscreen map
- Established: 1932
- Location: Plaza Dr. Gómez Ulla, Alicante, 03013, Spain
- Coordinates: 38°21′14″N 0°28′35″W
- Type: Archaeology museum
- Curator: Public (Diputación de Alicante)
- Public transit access: MARQ Station, Alicante Tram
- Website: marqalicante.com

The Archaeological Museum of Alicante (Spanish: Museo Arqueológico Provincial de Alicante, Valencian: Museu Arqueològic Provincial d'Alacant, abbreviated as MARQ) is an archaeological museum in Alicante, Spain. The museum won the European Museum of the Year Award in 2004, a few years after significant expansion and reallocation to renovated buildings of the antique hospital of San Juan de Dios. The museum houses eight galleries that use multimedia to allow visitors to interact with the lives of past residents of the region.

== See also ==
- List of museums in Spain
