= List of Alicante citizens =

List of notable people

This is a list of notable people from the city of Alicante, Spain or notable foreigners who live or lived there:

- Francisca Aguirre, (1930- 2019), poet
- Rafael Altamira y Crevea (1866–1951), co-founder of Permanent Court of International Justice so-called the World Court, after 1945 International Court of Justice
- Arkano, rapper
- Carlos Arniches (1866–1943), novelist
- Francisco Javier de Balmis (1753–1819), physician who headed the Balmis expedition to vaccinate the Spanish-colonies population against smallpox.
- Miriam Blasco, judoka Olympic winner
- Esther Cañadas, model and actor
- Lorenzo Carbonell Santacruz, mayor in 1931–1936
- Francesc de Paula Castelló Aleu (1914-1936), chemist, blessed Roman Catholic
- Alex de Minaur, tennis player
- José María Dols Abellán (1953–2014), bullfighter
- José María Dols Samper, bullfighter and model (son of above)
- Antoni Egea, artist
- Juan Escarré (1969), field hockey player
- Isabel Fernández, judoka Olympic winner
- Pedro Ferrándiz, basketball coach
- David Ferrer, tennis player
- Lola Forner (1960), former Miss Spain 1979 and actor
- Antonio Gades (1936–2004), Flamenco dancer
- Miguel Hernández, poet
- Ricardo Llorca (born 1962), composer
- Kiko Martínez, boxer
- Gabriel Miró (1879–1930), novelist
- George Washington Montgomery (1804–1841), United States diplomat and editor/publisher of the first Spanish-language translation of the works of Washington Irving.
- Nahemah, Extreme metal band
- Solveig Nordström, archeologist
- Sandra Paños, goalkeeper
- José Perramón, handball player
- Belén Rueda, actor
- Francisco Rufete, footballer
- Manuel Senante (1873–1959), Carlist publisher and politician
- Ilia Topuria, UFC fighter
- Asunción Valdés (born 1950), journalist
