= Gran Sol =

Coordinates: 38°20′38″N 0°28′59″W

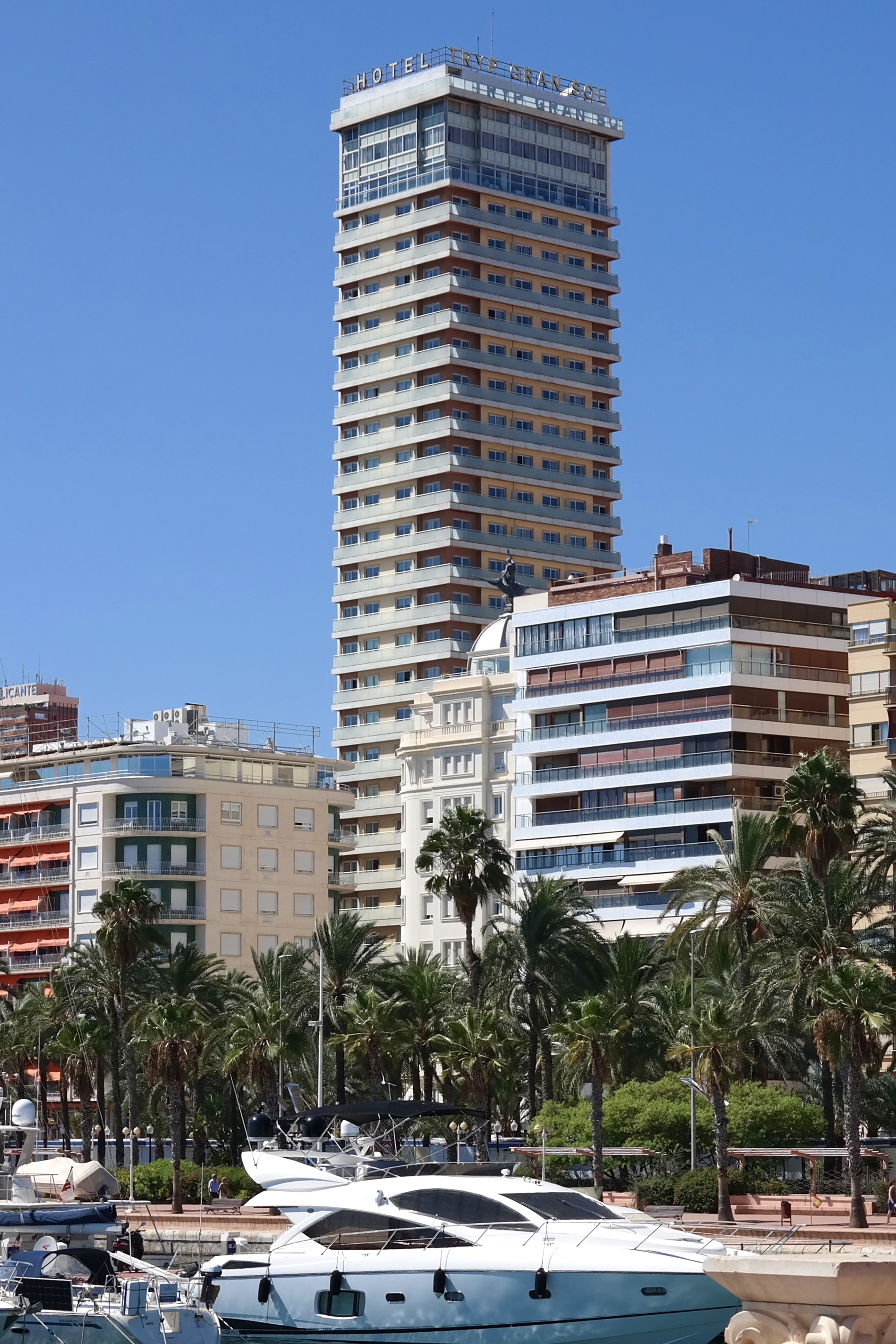
- The hotel with the marina in the foreground
- Interactive map of the Gran Sol area
- Former names: Tryp Gran Sol
- Alternative names: Hotel Alicante Gran Sol

General information
- Status: Completed
- Type: Hotel
- Location: Alicante, Spain
- Completed: 1971

Height
- Height: 97 m (318 ft)

Technical details
- Floor count: 31

Design and construction
- Architect: Miguel López González
- Other designers: Manuel Baeza

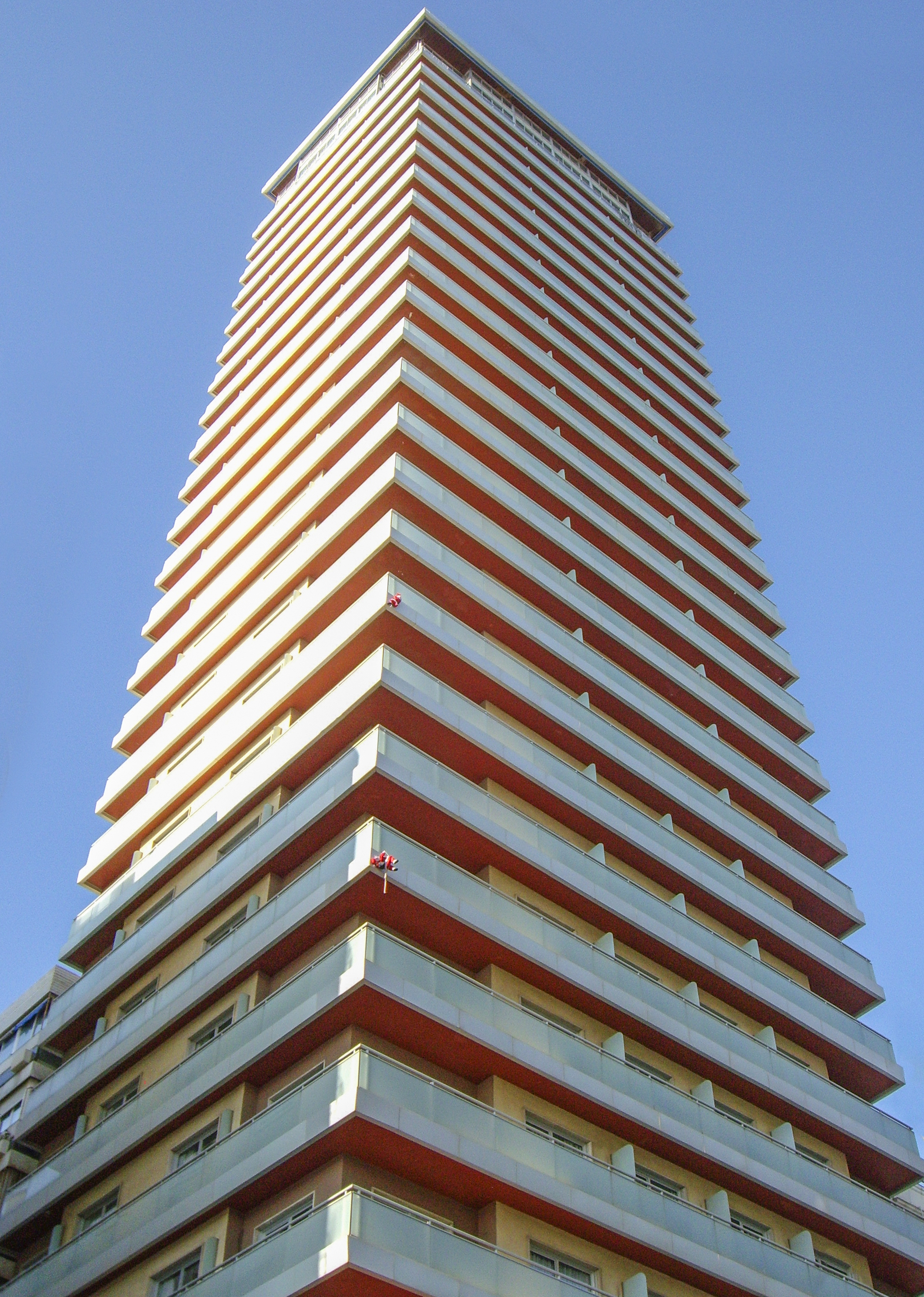
Looking up from street level (2007)

Alicante Gran Sol (formerly Tryp Gran Sol, officially Hotel Alicante Gran Sol Affiliated by Meliá) is a skyscraper and hotel in Alicante, Spain. It is 97 meters tall and has 31 floors and belongs to the Spanish hotel group Meliá Hotels International.

The hotel is the third tallest building in the city after Estudiotel Alicante (117 m) and El Barco (111 m). The "Great Sun" is characterized by the colorful murals painted on two of its facades, and to be located opposite the Port of Alicante, has become, along with the Castillo de Santa Barbara, a characteristic element of the horizon or skyline of the city.

The hotel was completed in 1971 and was completely renovated in 2003, has 123 four star (****) rooms and a restaurant on the 26th floor.

== See also ==
- Estudiotel Alicante
