= Museo de Arte Contemporáneo =

Museo de Arte Contemporáneo (English: Museum of Contemporary Art) may refer to:

- Museo de Arte Contemporáneo de Rosario, Argentina
- Museo de Arte Contemporáneo (Santiago, Chile), Chile
- Museo de Arte Contemporáneo Valdivia, Chile
- Castillo de Montsoreau-Museo de Arte Contemporáneo, France
- Museo de Arte Contemporáneo de Monterrey, Mexico
- Museo de Arte Contemporáneo de Alicante, Spain
- Museo de Arte Contemporáneo de Castilla y León, Spain
- Museo de Arte Contemporáneo (Madrid), Spain

== See also ==
- Museo Universitario Arte Contemporáneo, Mexico City
- List of contemporary art museums
