= Alicante =

Municipality in Valencian Community, Spain

Alicante Alacant
- City and municipality
- Alacant / Alicante (official)
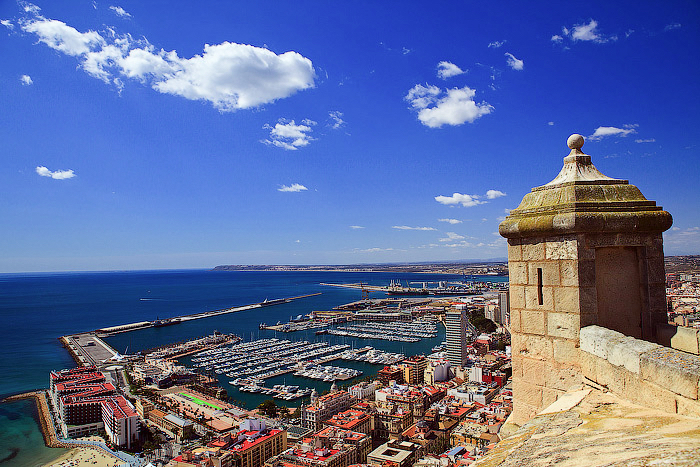
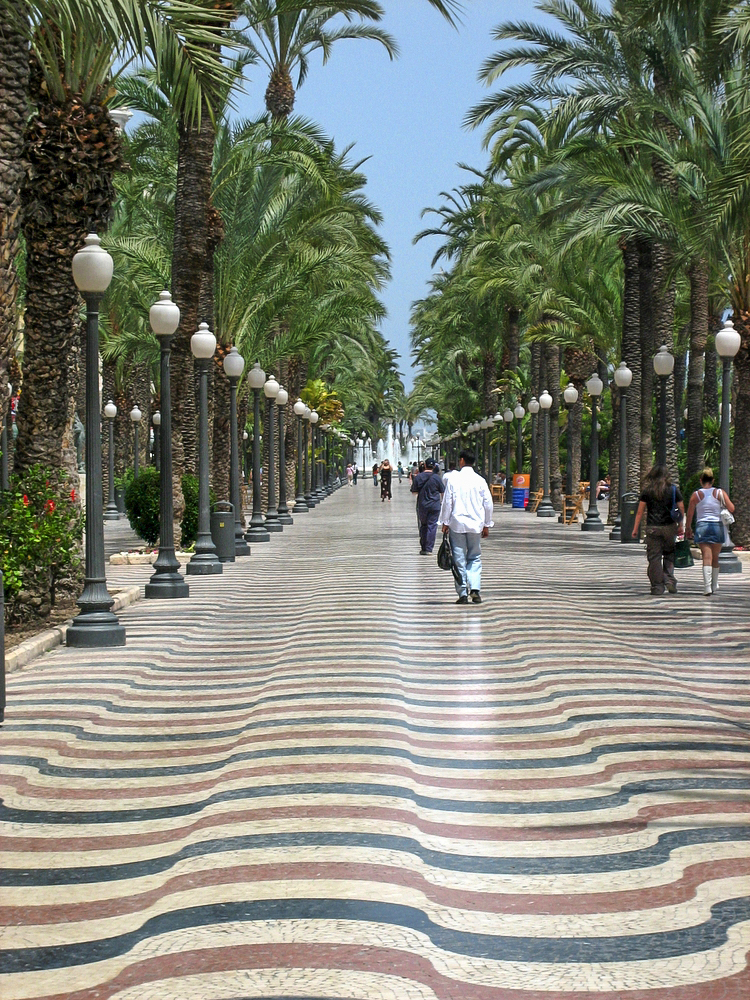
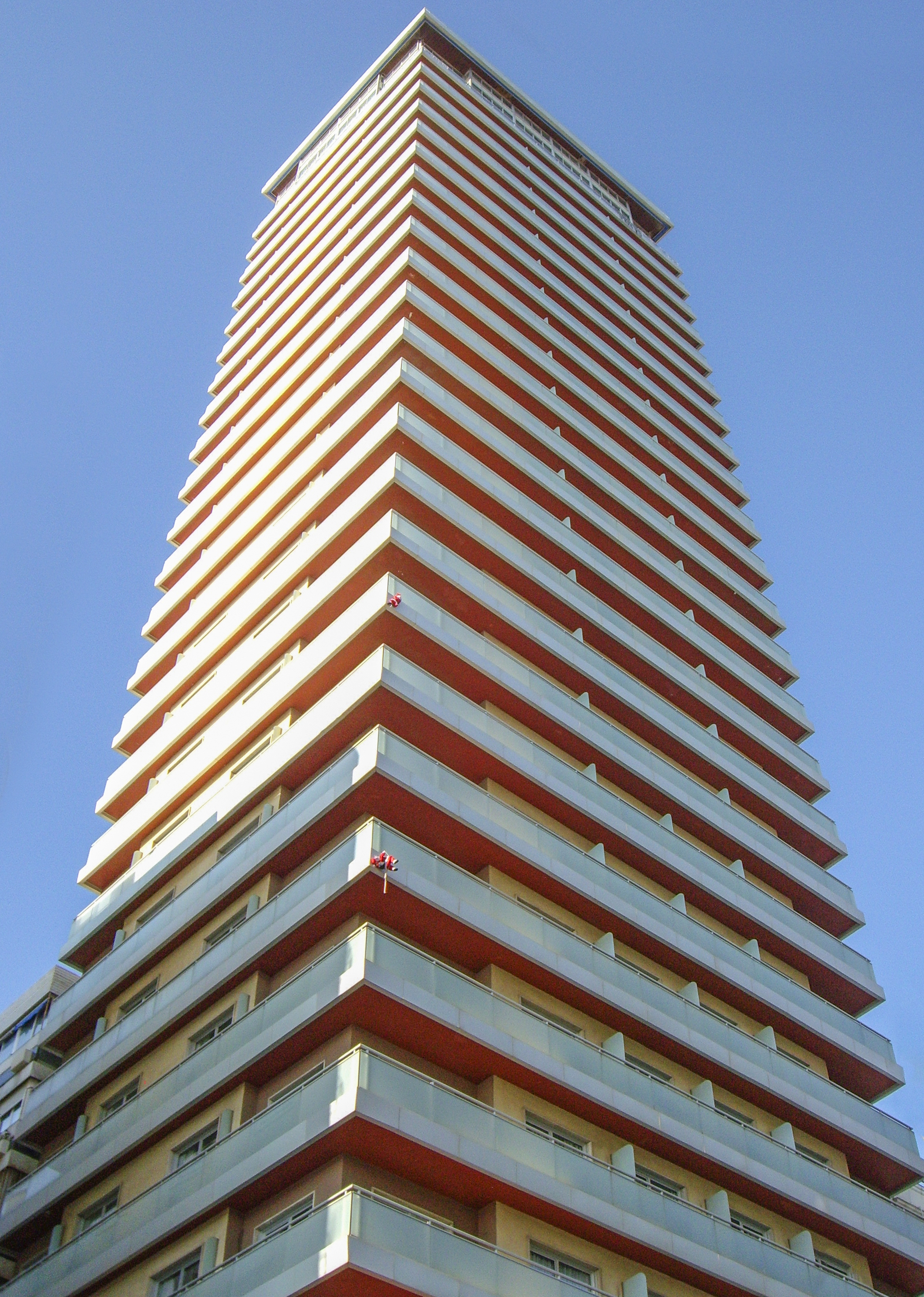
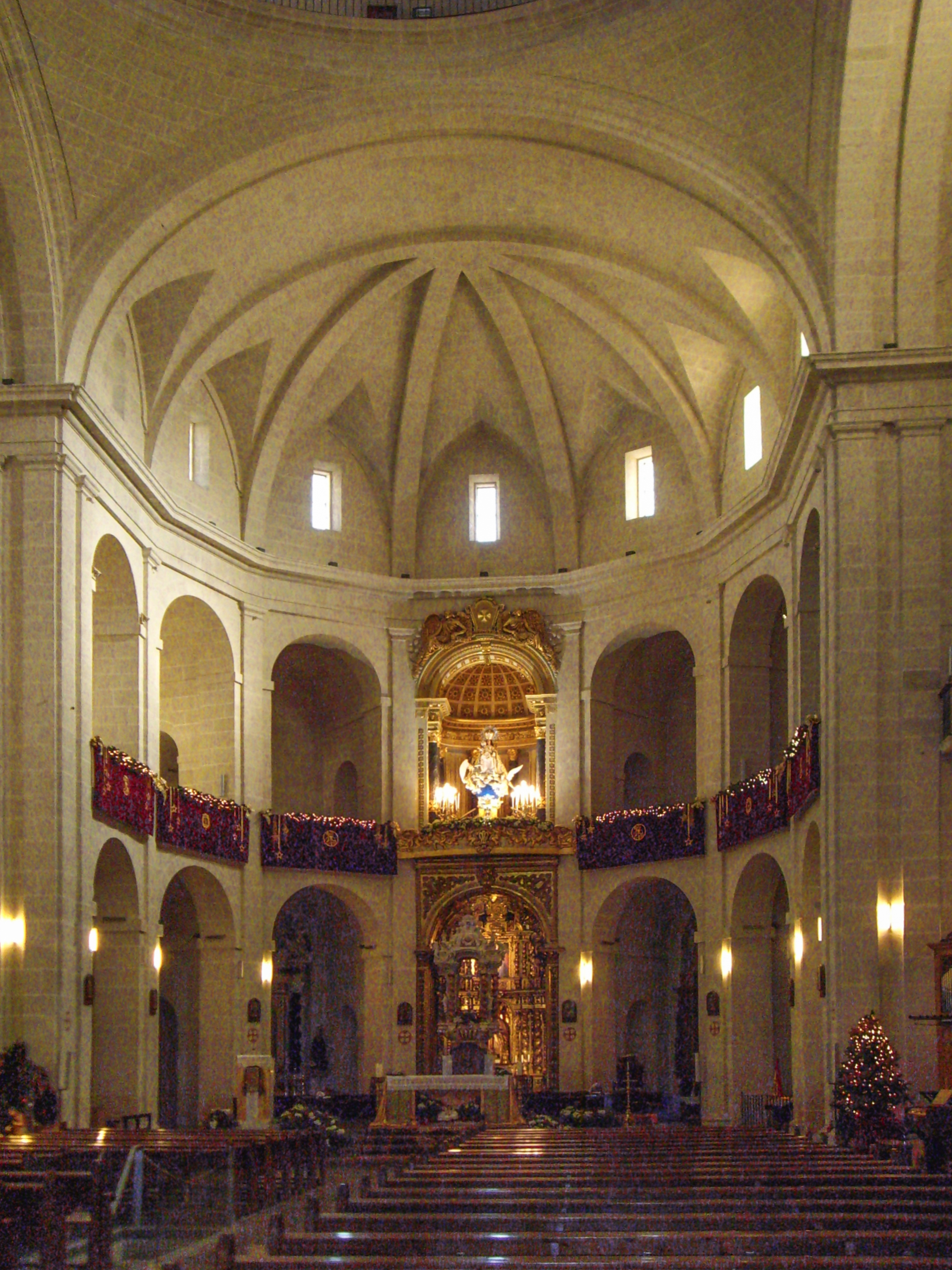
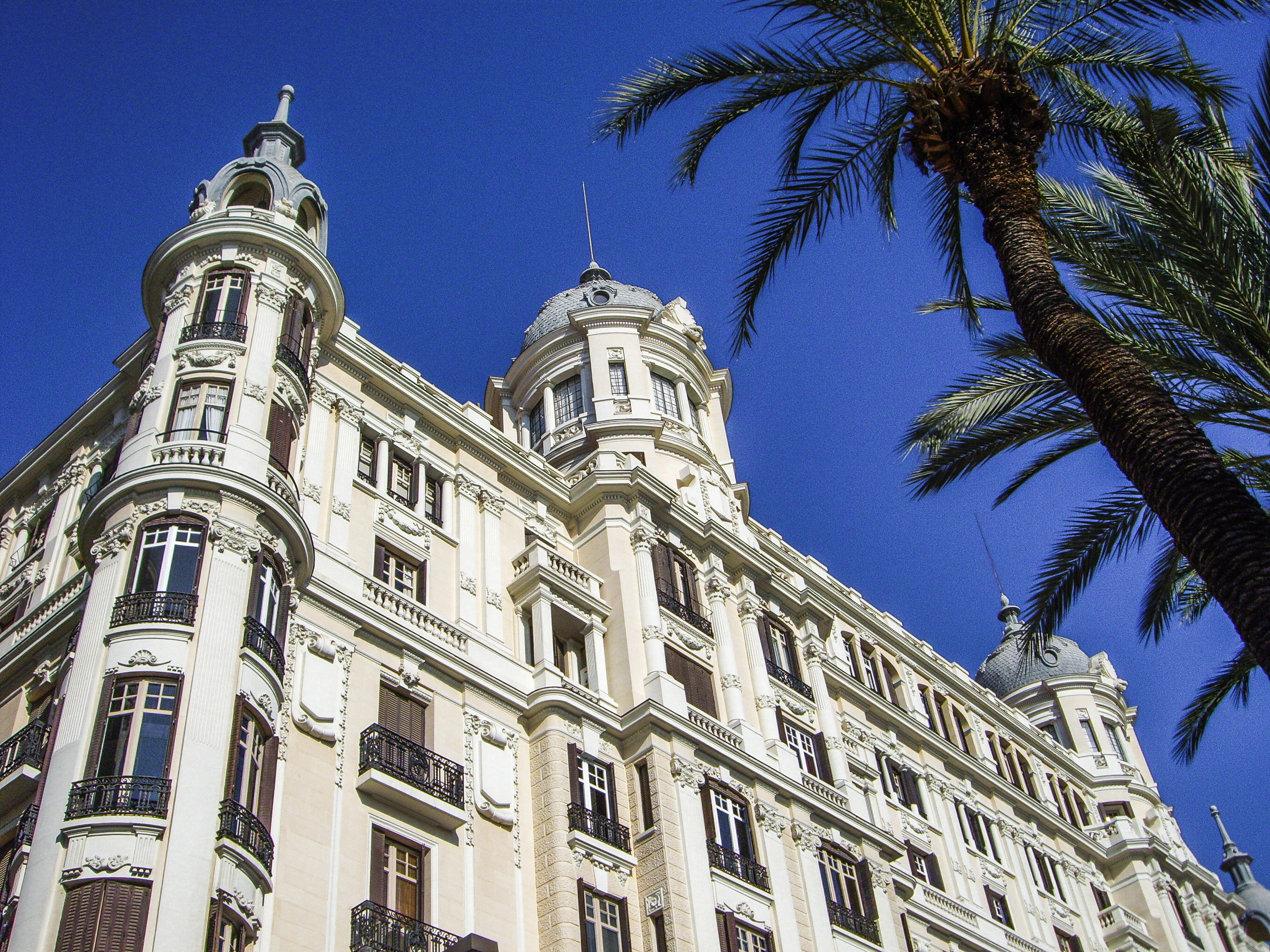
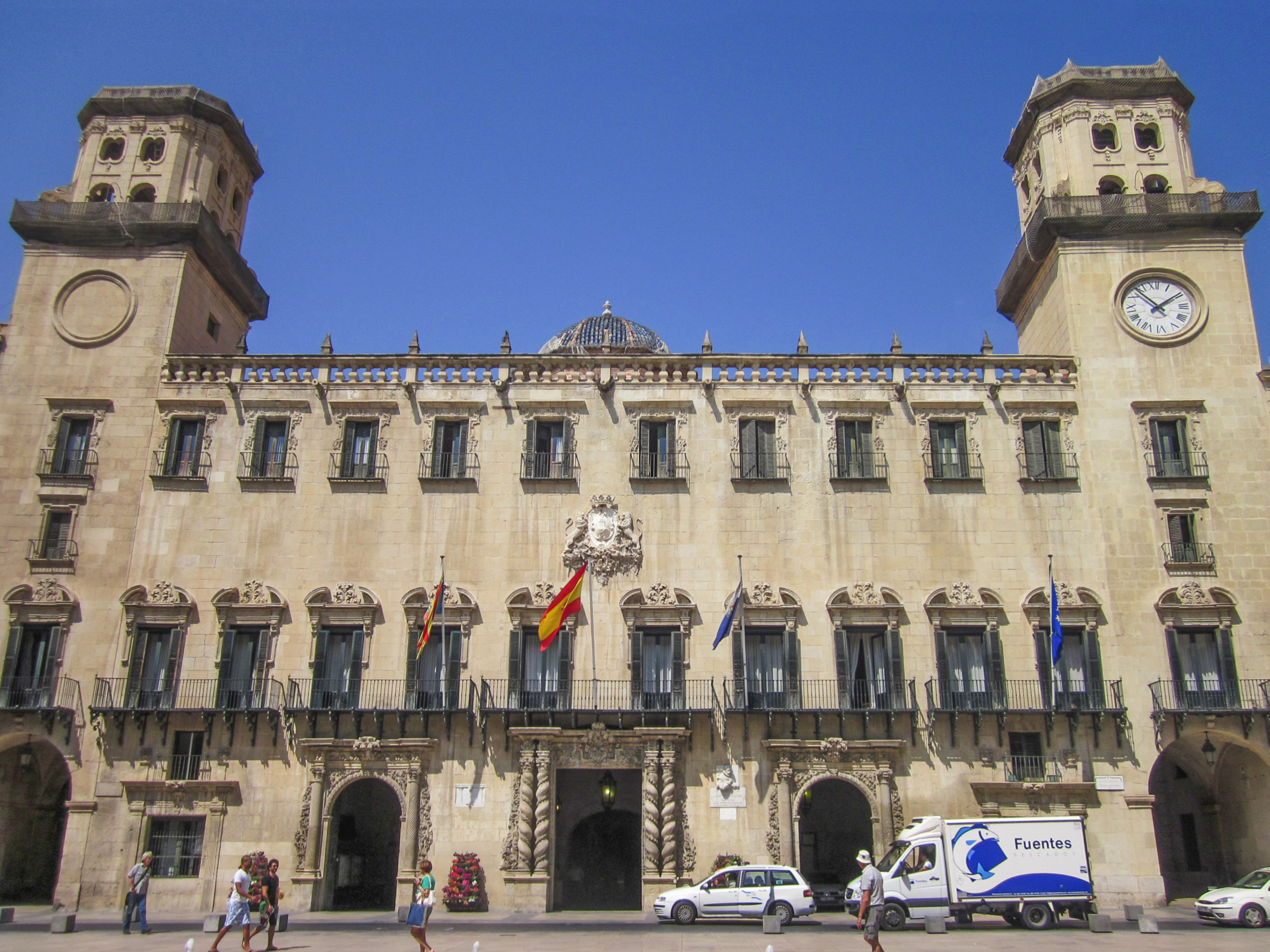
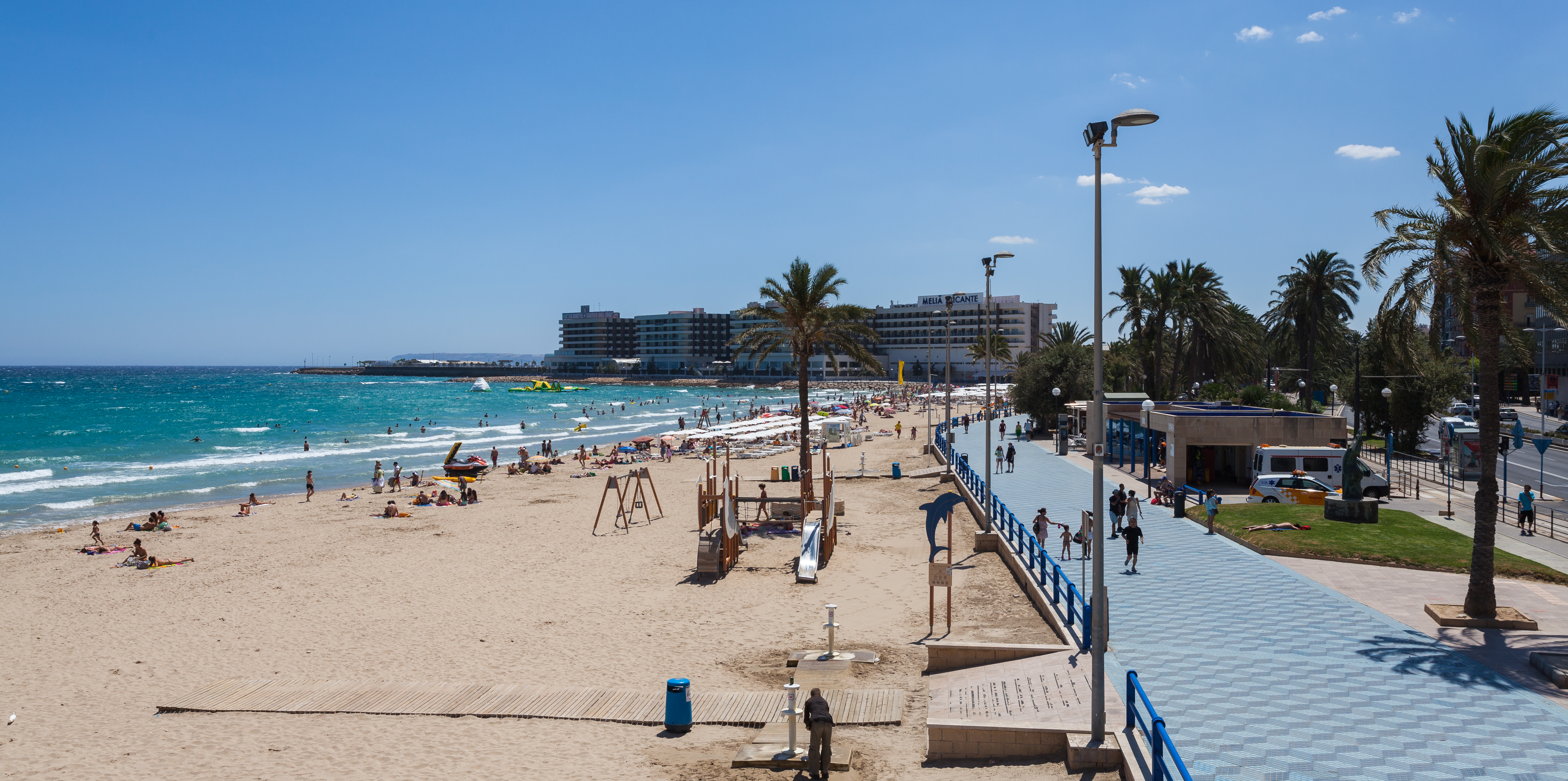
- View of the harbour with the Castle of Santa Bárbara in the foreground Explanada de España Gran Sol Co-cathedral Casa Carbonell City hall Beach of El Postiguet

- Flag Coat of arms
- Interactive map of Alicante
- Location within Province of Alicante Location within Valencian Community Location within Spain Location within Europe
- Coordinates: 38°20′43″N 0°28′59″W
- Country: Spain
- Autonomous Community: Valencian Community
- Province: Alacant / Alicante
- Comarca: Alacantí
- Founded: 324 BC
- Entities of population: 12 entitats: Alacant / Alicante; El Rebolledo; Santa Faz (Santa Faç); Cañada del Fenollar (Canyada del Fenollar); La Alcoraya (L'Alcoraia); El Bacarot; Fontcalent; Isla Plana or Nueva Tabarca (Illa Plana or Nova Tabarca); Verdegàs; Pla de la Vallonga; Moralet; Valle del Sol

Government
  - Alcalde (Mayor): Luis Barcala (PP)

Area
  - Total: 201.27 km^{2} (77.71 sq mi)
- Elevation (AMSL): 3 m (9.8 ft)

Population (2024)
  - Total: 358,608
  - Rank: 10th in Spain
  - Density: 1,781.7/km^{2} (4,614.6/sq mi)
- Demonyms: • alacantí, -ina (Val.) • alicantino/a (Sp.)
- Official language(s): Valencian; Spanish
- Linguistic area: Valencian (in decline)

GDP
  - Metro: €34.014 billion (2020)
- Time zone: UTC+1 (CET)
  - Summer (DST): UTC+2 (CEST)
- Postal code: 03000-03016
- Area code(s): +34 (ES); 965- / 966- / 865- (A)
- ISO 3166-2: ES-A
- Website: www.alicante.es

Alicante, (Note: Pronunciation of Alicante: English: /ˌælɪˈkænti/, also UK: /-teɪ/, US: /ˌælɪˈkɑːnti, ˌɑːl-, -teɪ/ Spanish: [aliˈkante]) in Spanish, or Alacant, (Note: Pronunciation of Alacant: Valencian: [alaˈkant]) in Valencian (officially: Alacant / Alicante), is a city and municipality in the Valencian Community, Spain. It is the capital of the province of Alicante and a historical Mediterranean port. With a population of 358,608 as of 2024, it is the 2nd-largest city in the Valencian Community (after Valencia) and the 10th-largest in Spain.

Together with Elche (Elx) and other municipalities, Alicante forms a conurbation of nearly 1 million inhabitants.

== Etymology ==
The name of the city echoes the Arabic name Laqant (لَقَنْت), al-Laqant (اللَّقَنْت) or Al-qant (القنت), which in turn reflects the Latin Lucentum and Greek root Leuké (or Leuka), meaning 'white'.

== History ==
The area around Alicante has been inhabited for over 7,000 years. The first tribes of hunter-gatherers moved gradually from Central Europe between 5000 and 3000 BC. Some of the earlier settlements were made on the slopes of Mount Benacantil. By 1000 BC, Greek and Phoenician traders had begun to visit the eastern coast of Spain, establishing small trading ports and introducing the native Iberian tribes to the alphabet, iron, and the pottery wheel. The Carthaginian general Hamilcar Barca established the fortified settlement of Akra Leuké (Greek: Ἄκρα Λευκή, meaning 'White Mountain' or 'White Point'), in the mid-230s BC, which is generally presumed to have been on the site of modern Alicante.

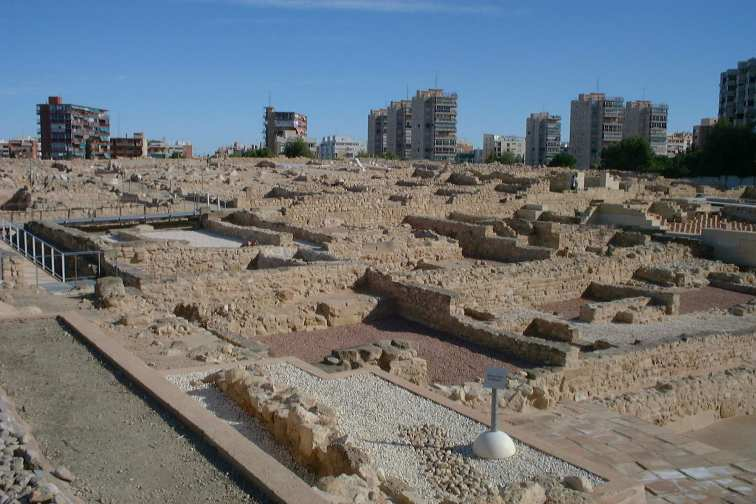
Archeological site of Tossal de Manises, ancient Iberian–Carthaginian–Roman city of Akra Leuké or Lucentum

Although the Carthaginians conquered much of the land around Alicante, the Romans eventually ruled Hispania Tarraconensis for over 700 years. By the 5th century AD, Rome was in decline, and the Roman predecessor town of Alicante, known as Lucentum (Latin), was more or less under the control of the Visigothic warlord Theudimer and thereafter under Visigothic rule from 400 to 700 A.D. The Goths did not put up much resistance to the Arab conquest of Medina Laqant at the beginning of the 8th century. The Moors ruled southern and eastern Spain until the 13th century Reconquista (Reconquest). Alicante was conquered again in 1247 for the Castilian king Alfonso X, but later was recovered to the Crown of Aragon in 1296 with King James II of Aragon. It gained the status of Royal Village (Vila Reial) with representation in the medieval Valencian Parliament (Corts Valencianes).

After several decades of being the battlefield where the Crown of Castile and the Crown of Aragon clashed, Alicante became a major Mediterranean trading station exporting rice, wine, olive oil, oranges, and wool. The local Jewish community was expelled in 1492, and later, between 1609 and 1614, King Felipe III expelled thousands of Moriscos who had remained in Valencia after the Reconquista. This act cost the region dearly; with so many skilled artisans and agricultural labourers gone, the feudal nobility found itself sliding into bankruptcy.

Conditions worsened in the early 18th century; after the War of the Spanish Succession, Alicante went into a long, slow decline, surviving through the 18th and 19th centuries by making shoes and growing agricultural produce such as oranges and almonds, and thanks to its fisheries. The end of the 19th century witnessed a sharp recovery of the local economy with increasing international trade and the growth of the city harbour leading to increased exports of several products (particularly during World War I when Spain was a neutral country).

During the early 20th century, Alicante was a minor capital that took profit from the benefit of Spain's neutrality during World War I, and it provided new opportunities for local industry and agriculture. The Rif War in the 1920s saw numerous alicantinos or alacantins drafted to fight in the long and bloody campaigns in the former Spanish protectorate (northern Morocco) against the Rif rebels. The political unrest of the late 1920s led to the victory of Republican candidates in local council elections throughout the country, and the abdication of King Alfonso XIII. The proclamation of the Second Spanish Republic was much celebrated in the city on 14 April 1931. The Spanish Civil War broke out on 17 July 1936. Alicante was the last city loyal to the Republican government to be occupied by General Franco's troops on 1 April 1939, and its harbour saw the last Republican government officials fleeing the country. Vicious air bombings were targeted on Alicante during the three years of civil conflict, most notably the bombing by the Italian Aviazione Legionaria of the Mercado on 25 May 1938 in which more than 300 civilians perished.

The port of Alicante was the site of the heroic episode of the British ship SS Stanbrook in 1939 at the end of the Spanish Civil War. Her captain Archibald Dickson decided to rescue thousands of Spanish Republicans families during the night of 28 March 1939 under the bombing of the Nazis.

From 1954 onward, many pied-noirs settled in the city (as many as 30,000, although other sources decrease the amount tenfold). Alicante had fostered strong links with Oran in the past, and a notable share of the population of the latter city during the French colonial period had ancestry in the province of Alicante. The immigration process accelerated after the independence of Algeria in 1962.

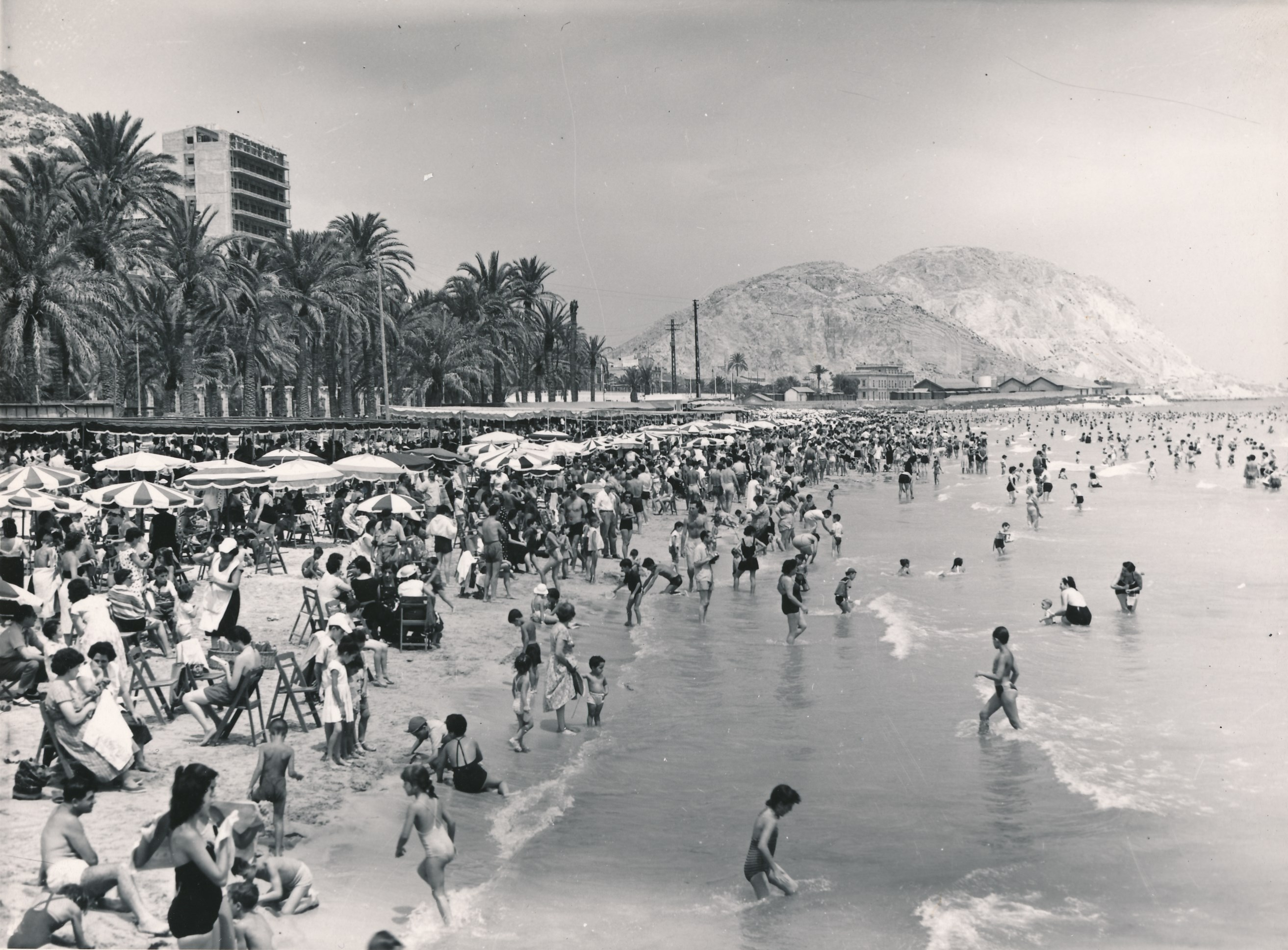
El Postiguet beach in 1957

The late 1950s and early 1960s saw the onset of a lasting transformation of the city by the tourist industry. Large buildings and complexes rose in nearby Albufereta, e.g. El Barco, and Playa de San Juan de Alicante, with the benign climate being the biggest draw to attract prospective buyers and tourists who kept the hotels reasonably busy. New construction benefited the whole economy, as the development of the tourism sector also spawned new businesses such as restaurants, bars, and other tourist-oriented enterprises. Also, the old airfield at Rabasa was closed and air traffic moved to the new El Altet Airport, which made a more convenient and modern facility for charter flights bringing tourists from northern European countries.

When Franco died in 1975, his successor Juan Carlos I played his part as the living symbol of the transition of Spain to a democratic constitutional monarchy. The governments of regional communities were given constitutional status as nationalities, and their governments were given more autonomy, including that of the Valencian region, the Generalitat Valenciana.

The Port of Alicante has been reinventing itself since the industrial decline the city suffered in the 1980s (with most mercantile traffic lost to Valencia's harbour). In recent years, the Port Authority has established it as one of the most important ports in Spain for cruises, with 72 calls to port made by cruise ships in 2007 bringing some 80,000 passengers and 30,000 crew to the city each year. The moves to develop the port for more tourism have been welcomed by the city and its residents, but the latest plans to develop an industrial estate in the port have caused great controversy.

== Geography ==
Alicante is located in the southeast of the Iberian Peninsula, on the shores of the Mediterranean Sea. Some orographic features rise over the largely flat terrain where the city is built on including the Cabo de la Huerta, the Serra Grossa, the Tossal and the Benacantil hills.

Located in an arid territory, Alicante lacks any meaningful permanent water stream. There are however several stream beds correspondent to intermittent ramblas. There was a swamp area in the northeast of the municipality, l'Albufereta, yet it was dried up in 1928.

The municipality has two exclaves in the mainland: Monnegre (between the municipalities of Sant Vicent del Raspeig, Mutxamel, Busot and Xixona), and Cabeçó d'Or; the latter comprises part of the namesake Cabeçó d'Or mountain (including the summit, 1209 metres above sea level). The small island of Tabarca, 8 nautical miles to the south of the city, also belongs to the municipality.

The foot of the main staircase of the City Hall Building (ayuntamiento or ajuntament; also known as casa consistorial) is the zero point (cota cero), used as the point of reference for measuring the height above or below sea level of any point in Spain, due to the marginal tidal variations of the Mediterranean sea at Alicante.

=== Climate ===
Alicante has mild winter temperatures, hot and sultry summers, and little rain, concentrated in equinoctial periods. Like the rest of the Province of Alicante itself, which has a range of dry climate types, the city has a hot semi-arid climate (BSh) according to the Köppen climate classification. It is one of the driest cities in Europe. Daily variations in temperature are generally small because of the stabilising influence of the sea, although occasional periods of westerly wind can produce temperature changes of 15 °C (27 °F) or more. Seasonal temperature variations are also relatively small, meaning that winters are mild and summers are hot. During the summer, due to the evaporation of warm Mediterranean waters, air humidity levels are high, making the day and night stuffy for much of the season. These high humidity levels increase the heat index.

The average rainfall is 284.5 mm (11.2 in) per year. The cold drop means that September and October are the wettest months. Rarely, the rainfall can be torrential, reaching over 100 mm (4 in) in a 24-hour period, leading to severe flooding. Because of this irregularity, only 35 rainy days are observed on average per year, and the annual number of sunshine hours is more than 3,000.

The record maximum temperature of 42.0 °C (107.6 °F) was observed on 13 August 2022. The record minimum temperature of −4.6 °C (23.7 °F) was recorded on 12 February 1956. The worst flooding in the city's modern history occurred on 30 September 1997 when 270.2 mm (10.6 in) of rain fell within six hours. Temperatures below 2 °C (36 °F) are very rare; the last recorded snowfall occurred in 1926. Alicante enjoys one of the sunniest and warmest winter daytime temperatures in mainland Europe. Alicante also recorded the highest temperature ever recorded in peninsular Spain and one of the highest in Europe for a month of January, which was 29.8 °C (85.6 °F).

Climate data for Alicante, 81 m (266 ft) (1991–2020 normals, extremes 1960-present)
Month	Jan	Feb	Mar	Apr	May	Jun	Jul	Aug	Sep	Oct	Nov	Dec	Year
Record high °C (°F)	29.8 (85.6)	29.4 (84.9)	32.6 (90.7)	33.8 (92.8)	37.0 (98.6)	38.4 (101.1)	41.4 (106.5)	42.0 (107.6)	38.4 (101.1)	36.2 (97.2)	30.6 (87.1)	26.6 (79.9)	42.0 (107.6)
Mean maximum °C (°F)	22.3 (72.1)	23.4 (74.1)	26.5 (79.7)	28.1 (82.6)	31.0 (87.8)	33.9 (93.0)	35.2 (95.4)	35.8 (96.4)	34.0 (93.2)	30.6 (87.1)	26.0 (78.8)	23.1 (73.6)	37.1 (98.8)
Mean daily maximum °C (°F)	17.2 (63.0)	17.7 (63.9)	19.6 (67.3)	21.6 (70.9)	24.5 (76.1)	28.3 (82.9)	30.7 (87.3)	31.1 (88.0)	28.5 (83.3)	25.0 (77.0)	20.5 (68.9)	17.9 (64.2)	23.5 (74.4)
Daily mean °C (°F)	12.0 (53.6)	12.4 (54.3)	14.4 (57.9)	16.5 (61.7)	19.6 (67.3)	23.4 (74.1)	26.0 (78.8)	26.5 (79.7)	23.7 (74.7)	19.9 (67.8)	15.4 (59.7)	12.7 (54.9)	18.5 (65.4)
Mean daily minimum °C (°F)	6.7 (44.1)	7.2 (45.0)	9.1 (48.4)	11.4 (52.5)	14.6 (58.3)	18.5 (65.3)	21.3 (70.3)	21.8 (71.2)	18.8 (65.8)	14.8 (58.6)	10.3 (50.5)	7.5 (45.5)	13.5 (56.3)
Mean minimum °C (°F)	1.6 (34.9)	2.4 (36.3)	4.3 (39.7)	6.8 (44.2)	9.8 (49.6)	14.1 (57.4)	17.5 (63.5)	18.0 (64.4)	14.1 (57.4)	9.7 (49.5)	5.2 (41.4)	2.8 (37.0)	0.9 (33.6)
Record low °C (°F)	−2.6 (27.3)	−1.8 (28.8)	−1.0 (30.2)	2.6 (36.7)	4.8 (40.6)	10.4 (50.7)	13.4 (56.1)	13.2 (55.8)	9.4 (48.9)	4.0 (39.2)	0.2 (32.4)	−2.5 (27.5)	−2.6 (27.3)
Average precipitation mm (inches)	23.9 (0.94)	17.3 (0.68)	28.7 (1.13)	28.6 (1.13)	18.9 (0.74)	8.4 (0.33)	3.2 (0.13)	13.4 (0.53)	51.1 (2.01)	33.1 (1.30)	32.8 (1.29)	25.1 (0.99)	284.5 (11.2)
Average precipitation days (≥ 1 mm)	3.1	2.6	3.8	3.8	2.9	1.4	0.4	1.5	3.4	4.2	4.0	3.6	34.7
Average relative humidity (%)	66	65	64	62	62	61	63	65	68	69	67	68	65
Mean monthly sunshine hours	191	193	236	259	300	322	345	320	260	228	185	175	3,014
Percentage possible sunshine	63	64	63	65	68	73	77	76	70	66	61	59	67
Source 1: Agencia Estatal de Meteorología (AEMET OpenData)
Source 2: Agencia Estatal de Meteorología

Climatological normals for Alicante (period 1991–2020)
Parameter	Jan	Feb	Mar	Apr	May	Jun	Jul	Aug	Sep	Oct	Nov	Dec
Average number of Storm days	0.3	0.3	0.3	1.5	2.0	1.4	0.8	1.4	2.8	1.5	0.5	0.5
Mean number of days with fog	0.1	0.5	0.4	0.2	0.0	0.0	0.0	0.0	0.1	0.1	0.1	0.1
Average number of frost days	0.2	0.2	0.0	0.0	0.0	0.0	0.0	0.0	0.0	0.0	0.0	0.1
Average number of clear days	7.6	7.0	6.4	6.1	6.1	10.2	13.8	12.8	5.3	5.0	5.9	6.2

Average sea temperature:
Jan	Feb	Mar	Apr	May	Jun	Jul	Aug	Sep	Oct	Nov	Dec	Year
15 °C (59 °F)	14 °C (57 °F)	14 °C (57 °F)	16 °C (61 °F)	19 °C (66 °F)	22 °C (72 °F)	25 °C (77 °F)	26 °C (79 °F)	25 °C (77 °F)	23 °C (73 °F)	19 °C (66 °F)	17 °C (63 °F)	19.6 °C (67.3 °F)

== Demographics ==
Historical population
Year	Pop.	±%
1250	2,500	—
1350	3,250	+30.0%
1418	1,539	−52.6%
1609	5,040	+227.5%
1646	6,174	+22.5%
1717	11,019	+78.5%
1735	12,604	+14.4%
1754	14,394	+14.2%
1768	17,213	+19.6%
1786	17,345	+0.8%
1797	19,313	+11.3%
1803	21,447	+11.0%
1842	20,199	−5.8%
1857	28,847	+42.8%
1877	36,946	+28.1%
1887	42,172	+14.1%
1900	51,874	+23.0%
1910	56,327	+8.6%
1920	64,490	+14.5%
1930	72,474	+12.4%
1940	89,198	+23.1%
1950	101,791	+14.1%
1960	121,832	+19.7%
1970	181,550	+49.0%
1981	245,963	+35.5%
1991	265,473	+7.9%
2001	284,580	+7.2%
2011	329,325	+15.7%
2021	338,768	+2.9%
Source: Historical population data sources: 1250–1609: estimates by historians; 1646: Vecindario del archivo del Reino de Valencia; 1717–1803: various censuses prepared by the governments of Spain; from 1857: INE

The population of Alicante is 358,608 as of 2024, and 768,194 in the Alicante-Elche metropolitan area as of 2016. The foreign-born population of the city is 96,826, equal to 27% of the total population, most of them immigrants who have arrived in the previous 20 years. Besides which, there is an estimation of additional thousands coming from countries outside the EU (mostly from the African continent) that are under illegal alien status and therefore are not accounted for in official population figures.

Foreign population by country of birth (2024)
Nationality	Population
Colombia	14,629
Algeria	10,321
Argentina	8,822
Morocco	6,181
Venezuela	6,089
Ukraine	6,062
Russia	4,426
Ecuador	3,977
France	2,825
Cuba	2,441
Romania	2,119
China	1,897
Italy	1,599
Brazil	1,510
Peru	1,436

== Administration ==
Luis Barcala of the People's Party has been the mayor of Alicante since 19 April 2018. He became mayor after the resignation of Gabriel Echávarri, when the councillor Nerea Belmonte defected from Guanyar Alacant and refused to support the Socialist Party replacement candidate Eva Montesinos.

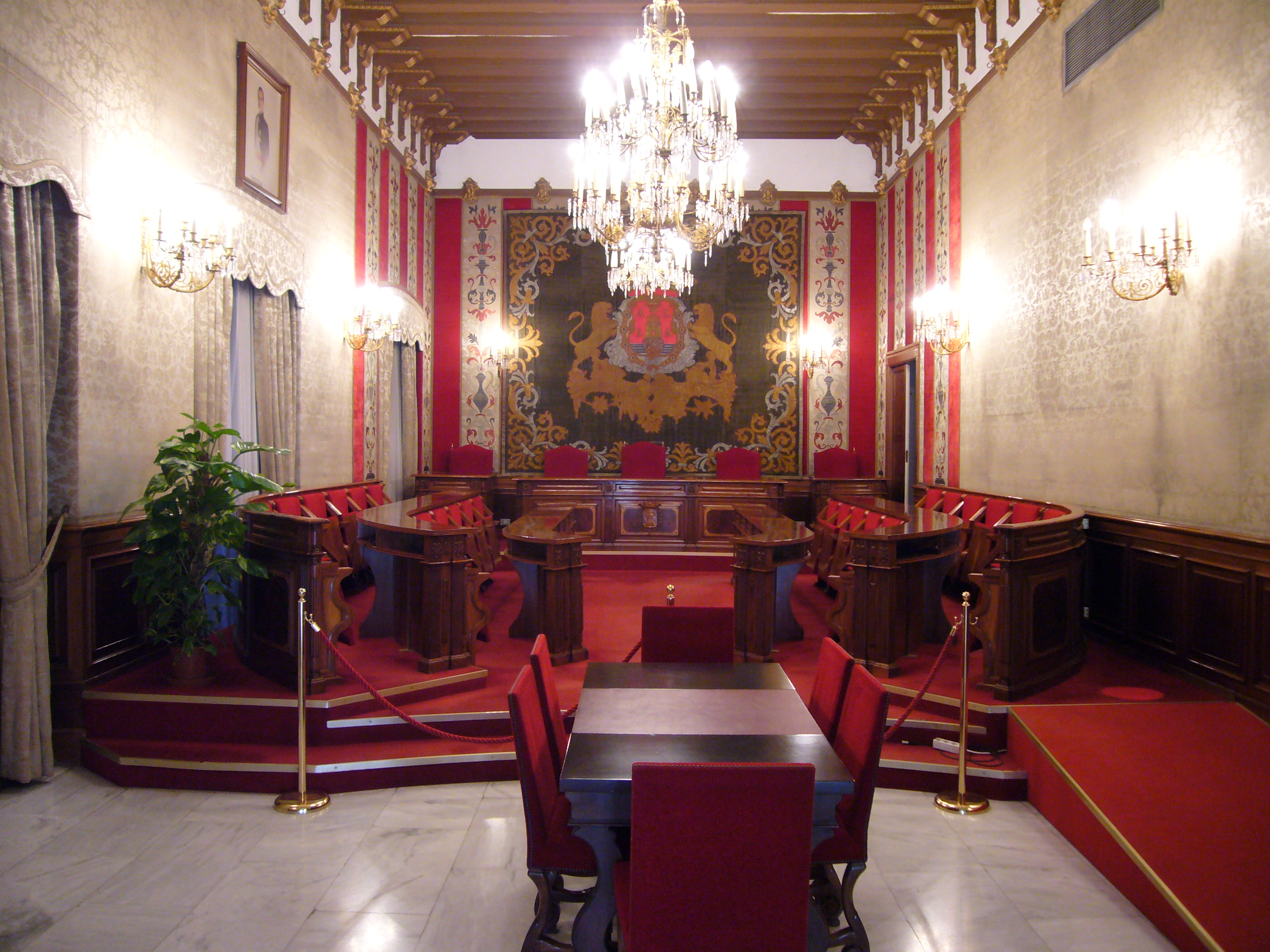
Plenary hall where the municipal council meets.

Gabriel Echávarri of the Socialist Party (PSOE) was the mayor of the city from 13 June 2015 until April 2018, following the municipal elections on 24 May 2015. He was supported by the votes from his group (6), plus those from leftist parties Guanyar Alacant (6) and Compromís (3), as well as from the centre-right party Ciudadanos (6). The People's Party (Partido Popular, PP), with only 8 elected seats, lost the majority. On April he resigned due to various judicial issues and was temporarily substituted by the councillor Eva Montesinos.

In the previous municipal elections of May 2011, Sonia Castedo of People's Party won the elections with an absolute majority, but resigned in December 2014 due to her involvement in several corruption scandals, at present being under investigation. Her fellow party member Miguel Valor went on to become mayor up until Echávarri's election.

== Economy ==
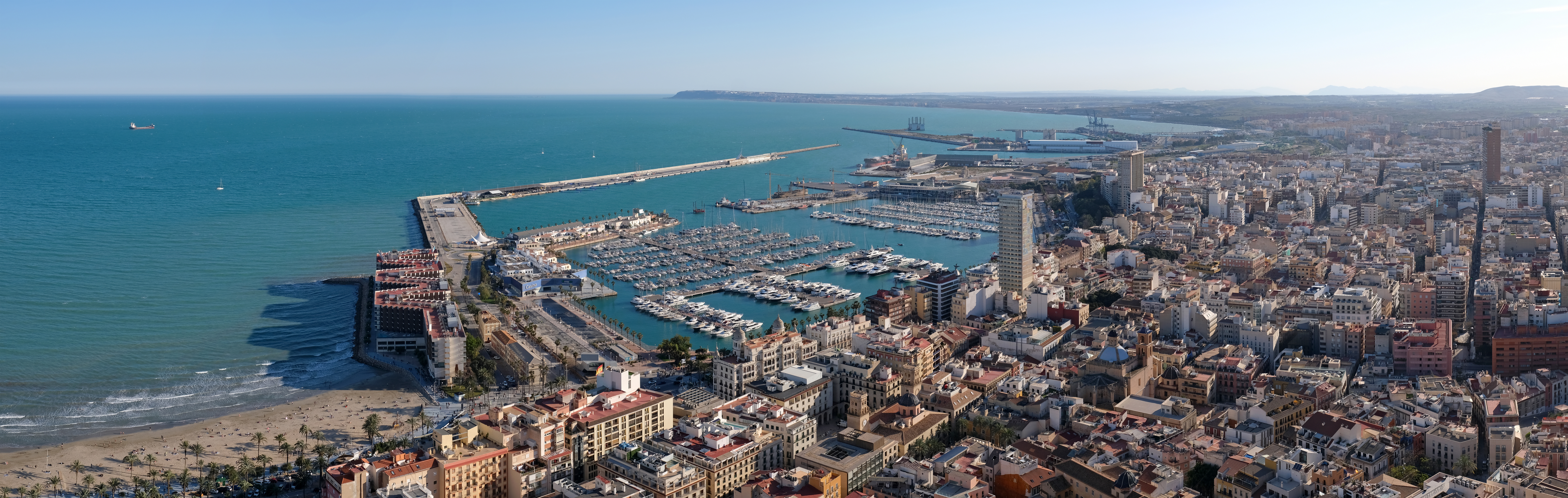
Port of Alicante

Until the Great Recession, Alicante was one of the fastest-growing cities in Spain. The boom depended partly on tourism directed to the beaches of the Costa Blanca and particularly on the second residence-construction boom which started in the 1960s and revived again by the late 1990s. Services and public administration also play a major role in the city's economy. The construction boom has raised many environmental concerns and both the local autonomous government and city council are under scrutiny by the European Union. The construction surge was the subject of hot debates among politicians and citizens alike. The latest of many public battles concerns the plans of the Port Authority of Alicante to construct an industrial estate on reclaimed land in front of the city's coastal strip, in breach of local, national, and European regulations. (See Port of Alicante for details).

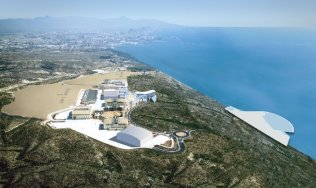
Ciudad de la Luz or Ciutat de la Llum

The city serves as the headquarters of the European Union Intellectual Property Office and a sizeable population of European public workers live there.

The campus of the University of Alicante (Universitat d'Alacant or Universidad de Alicante) lies in Sant Vicent del Raspeig, bordering the city of Alicante to the north. More than 25,000 students attend the university.

Between 2005 and 2012 Ciudad de la Luz (Ciutat de la Llum), one of the largest film studios in Europe, had its base in Alicante. The studio shot Spanish and international movies such as Asterix at the Olympic Games by Frédéric Forestier and Thomas Langmann, and Manolete by Menno Meyjes. It was shut down in 2012 for violating European competition law.

== Transport ==
Alicante Airport outranks the Valencia Airport, being the busiest airport in the Valencian Community, and among the busiest airports in Spain after Madrid, Barcelona, Palma de Mallorca and Málaga. It is connected with Madrid and Barcelona by frequent Iberia and Vueling flights, and with many Western European cities through carriers such as Ryanair, EasyJet and Jet2. There are also regular flights to Algeria.

Alicante railway station is used by Cercanías Murcia/Alicante commuter rail services linking Alicante with suburbs and Murcia. Long-range Renfe trains run frequently to Madrid, Barcelona, and Valencia. In 2013, the Madrid–Levante high-speed rail network was extended to Alicante station, allowing AVE high-speed rail services to link to Madrid via Villena AV, Albacete-Los Llanos and Cuenca-Fernando Zóbel.

Alicante Metropolitan-TRAM connects different parts within the city, its metropolitan area and with outlying settlements along Costa Blanca as well. As of 2020, electric tram-trains run up to Benidorm, and diesel trains go further to Dénia.

The city has regular ferry services to Algeria. The city is strongly fortified, with a spacious harbour.

== Main sights ==
Amongst the most notable features of the city are the Castle of Santa Bárbara and the port of Alicante. The latter was the subject of bitter controversy in 2006–2007 as residents battled, successfully, to keep it from being changed into an industrial estate.

The Santa Bárbara castle is situated on Mount Benacantil, overlooking the city. The tower (La Torreta) at the top, is the oldest part of the castle, while part of the lowest zone and the walls were constructed later in the 18th century.

The promenade Explanada de España, lined by palm trees, is paved with 6.5 million marble floor tiles creating a wavy form. The Promenade extends from the Port of Alicante to the Gran Vía and ends at the famous statue by Mark Hersch. For the people of Alicante, the promenade is the meeting place for the traditional Spanish paseo, or stroll along the waterfront in the evenings, and a venue for outdoor musical concerts. At the end of the promenade is a monument by the artist Bañuls of the 19th century.

Barrio de la Santa Cruz is a colourful quarter of the old city, situated southwest of Santa Bárbara castle. Its small houses climb up the hill leading to the walls and the castle, through narrow streets decorated with flags and tubs of flowers.

L'Ereta Park is situated on the foothills of Mount Benacantil. It runs from the Santa Bárbara castle down to the old part of Alicante and consists of several levels, routes, decks, and rest stops which offer a panoramic view overlooking the city.

El Palmeral Park is one of the favourite parks of Alicante's citizens. It includes walking trails, children's playgrounds, ponds and brooks, picnic tables, and an auditorium for concerts.

Just a few kilometres from Alicante, on the Mediterranean Sea, lies Tabarca island. What was once a haven for Barbary pirates is now a tourist attraction.

Other sights include:

- Basilica of Santa María (14th–16th centuries), built-in Gothic style over the former main mosque. Other features include the high altar, in Rococo style, and the portal, in Baroque style, both from the 18th century.
- Co-cathedral of St. Nicholas of Bari (15th–18th centuries), also built over a mosque. It is the main church of Alicante and the bishop's seat.
- Monastery of Santa Faz (15th century), located 5 kilometres (3 miles) outside the city, in Baroque style.
- Defence towers of the Huerta de Alicante (15th–18th centuries), built to defend against the Barbary pirates. Today some 20 towers are still extant.
- Baroque Casa de La Asegurada (1685), the most ancient civil building in the city. (c. XVII). Today it is home to the Museum of Contemporary Art of Alicante.
- Casa consistorial de Alicante (18th century), also in Baroque style.
- Convent of the Canónigas de San Agustín (18th century).
- Gravina Palace (1748–1808), nowadays hosting Gravina Museum of Fine Arts.
- Castle of San Fernando.

There are a dozen museums in Alicante. On exhibition at the Archaeological Museum of Alicante (MARQ) are local artifacts dating from 100,000 years ago until the early 20th century. The collection is divided into different rooms representing three divisions of archaeological methodology: ground, urban and underwater archaeology, with dioramas, audiovisual and interactive zones. The archaeological museum won the European Museum of the Year Award in 2004. Gravina Museum of Fine Arts presents several paintings and sculptures from the 16th century to the 19th century. Asegurada Museum of Contemporary Art houses a major collection of twentieth-century art, composed mainly of works donated by Eusebio Sempere.

== Festivals ==
The most important festival, the Bonfires of Saint John (Hogueras de San Juan / Fogueres de Sant Joan), takes place during the summer solstice. This is followed a week later by five nights of firework and pyrotechnic contests between companies on the urban beach Playa del Postiguet. Another well-known festival is Moors and Christians (Moros y Cristianos) in Altozano or San Blas district. Overall, the city boasts a year-round nightlife for the enjoyment of tourists, residents, and a large student population of the University of Alicante. The nightlife social scene tends to shift to nearby Playa de San Juan during the summer months.

Every summer in Alicante, a two-month-long programme of music, theatre and dance is staged in the Paseo del Puerto.

== Sport ==
For the 2023/24 season Alicante has two football clubs in the top four levels of Spanish football; Hércules CF and CF Intercity. For the 2023/24 season Hércules compete in Segunda Federación, the 4th level and are well known as they played in La Liga (the Spanish Premier Division) during the 1996/1997 season and again in 2010/2011. They have had many famous players such as David Trezeguet, Royston Drenthe and Nelson Valdez. Hércules are also known for their victory over Barcelona in 1997 which led to Real Madrid winning the league. Home games are played at the 30,000-capacity José Rico Pérez Stadium.

The city's other club, Alicante CF, who played in the Third Division, was dissolved in 2014 due to economic problems. They were replaced the same year by newly formed club CFI Alicante.

Basketball club (HLA Alicante) Lucentum Alicante participates in the Spanish basketball league. It plays in the Centro de Tecnificación de Alicante.

Alicante serves as headquarters and the starting point of the Volvo Ocean Race, a yacht race around the world. The latest race sailed in January 2023.

== Notable people ==
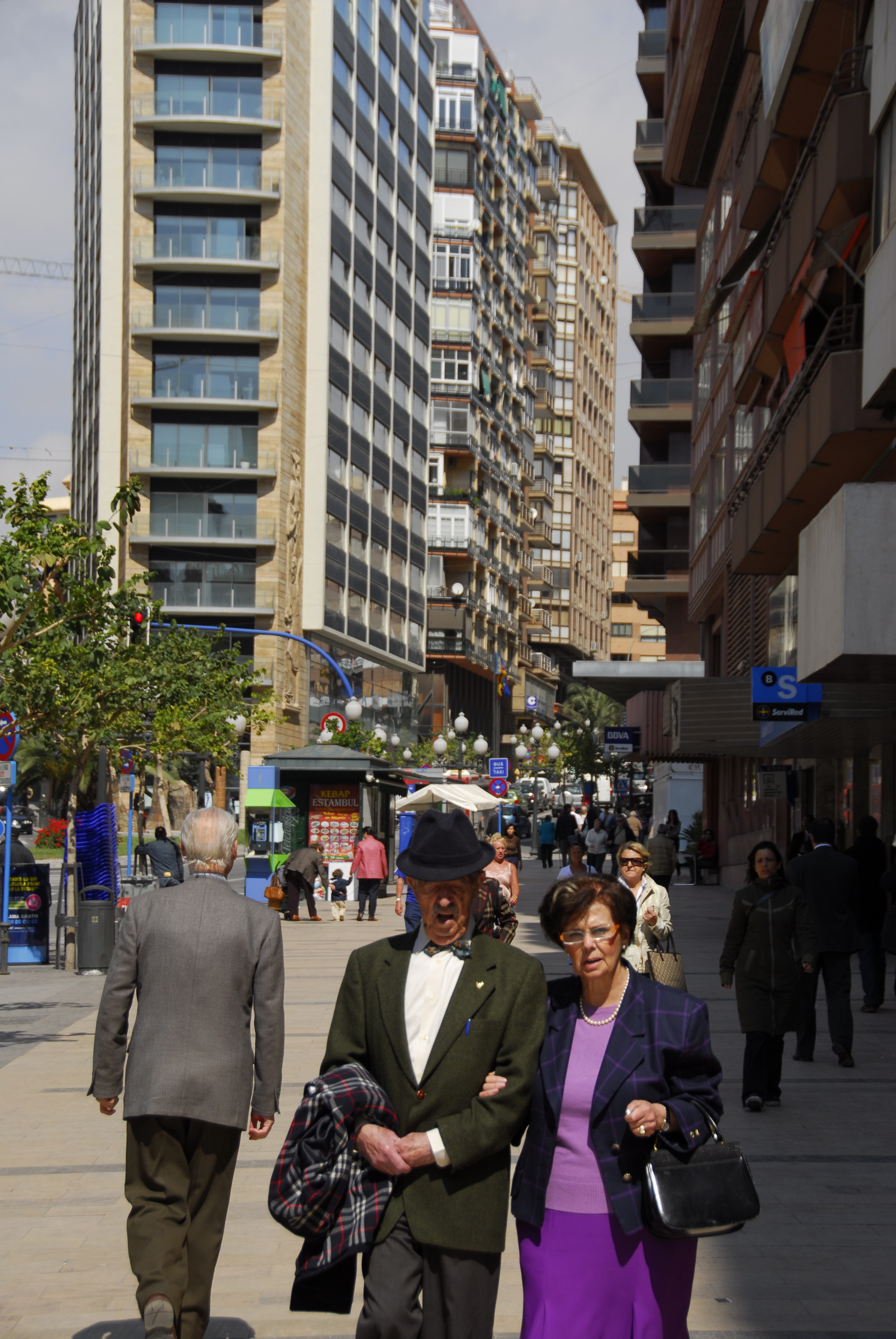
Alicantinos or Alacantins at the Rambla Méndez Núñez

- Francisca Aguirre, (1930–2019), poet
- Rafael Altamira y Crevea (1866–1951), co-founder of Permanent Court of International Justice so-called the World Court, after 1945 International Court of Justice
- Arkano, rapper
- Carlos Arniches (1866–1943), novelist
- Francisco Javier de Balmis (1753–1819), physician who headed the Balmis expedition to vaccinate the Spanish-colonies population against smallpox.
- Miriam Blasco, judoka Olympic winner
- Esther Cañadas, model and actor
- Lorenzo Carbonell Santacruz, mayor in 1931–1936
- Francesc de Paula Castelló Aleu (1914–1936), chemist, blessed Roman Catholic
- Alex de Minaur, tennis player
- José María Dols Abellán (1953–2014), bullfighter
- José María Dols Samper, bullfighter and model (son of above)
- Antoni Egea, artist
- Juan Escarré (1969), field hockey player
- Isabel Fernández, judoka Olympic winner
- Pedro Ferrándiz, basketball coach
- David Ferrer, tennis player
- Lola Forner (1960), former Miss Spain 1979 and actor
- Antonio Gades (1936–2004), Flamenco dancer
- Miguel Hernández, poet
- Ricardo Llorca (born 1962), composer
- Kiko Martínez, boxer
- Gabriel Miró (1879–1930), novelist
- George Washington Montgomery (1804–1841), United States diplomat and editor/publisher of the first Spanish-language translation of the works of Washington Irving.
- Nahemah, Extreme metal band
- Solveig Nordström, archeologist
- Sandra Paños, goalkeeper
- José Perramón, handball player
- Belén Rueda, actor
- Francisco Rufete, footballer
- Manuel Senante (1873–1959), Carlist publisher and politician
- Ilia Topuria, featherweight and lightweight champion in the UFC
- Asunción Valdés (born 1950), journalist

== Twin towns – sister cities ==
Alicante is twinned with:

- Alexandria, Egypt
- Brighton and Hove, England, UK
- Carloforte, Italy
- Herzliya, Israel
- León, Nicaragua
- Matanzas, Cuba
- Nice, France
- Oran, Algeria
- Toyooka, Japan (1996)
- Wenzhou, China

== See also ==
- Castrum Album
- Saint Nicholas Day

== Bibliography ==
- Garrigós Monerris, José Ignacio; Daniel Villa, Aurora (2009). "Inmigración y proyectos migratorios. El caso de una pied-noir en Alicante" (PDF). Papers: Revista de Sociologia. 94 (94): 59–77. doi:10.5565/rev/papers/v94n0.689. ISSN 2013-9004. Archived (PDF) from the original on 9 October 2022.
- Martínez Martínez, Jorge (2014). "Estudio de la isla de calor de la ciudad de Alicante" (PDF). Investigaciones Geográficas (62). Alicante: Universidad de Alicante: 83–99. doi:10.14198/INGEO2014.62.06. ISSN 0213-4691. Archived (PDF) from the original on 9 October 2022.
