= Estudiotel Alicante =

Skyscraper in Spain

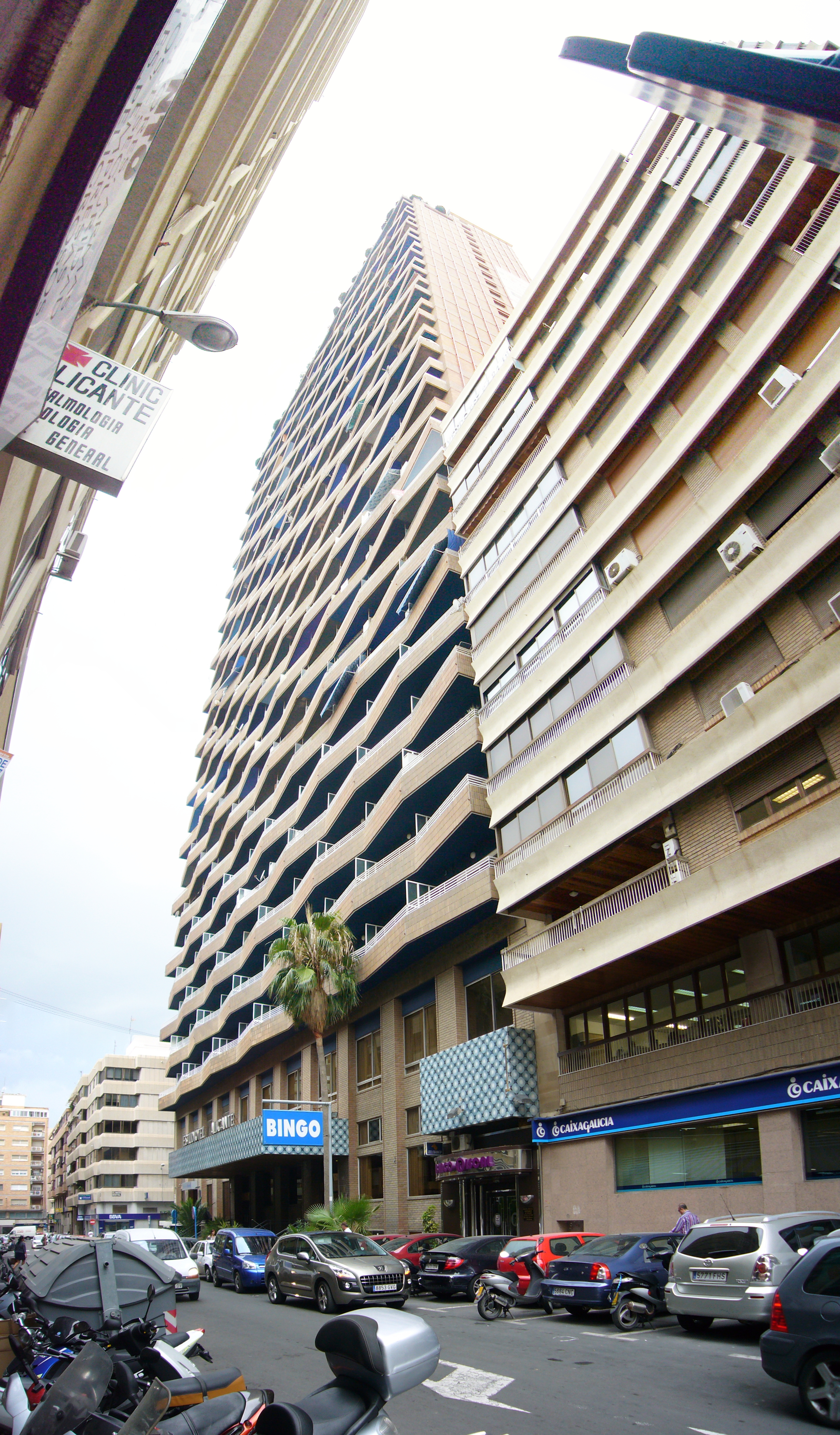
- Interactive map of the Estudiotel Alicante area

General information
- Status: Completed
- Type: Hotel
- Architectural style: Modern
- Location: Alicante, Spain
- Coordinates: 38.3445042°N 0.4904419°W
- Completed: 1962

Height
- Architectural: 117 m (384 ft)

Technical details
- Material: Concrete
- Floor count: 35

Design and construction
- Architect: Francisco Muñoz Llorens

Website
- www.estudiotelalicante.es

Estudiotel Alicante (also Riscal) is a skyscraper and hotel in Alicante, Spain. It is located at Poeta Vila y Blanco Street 4 in 03003 postal area near Plaza de los Luceros. It is 117 metres (384 ft) high, with 35 floors. It is the tallest building in the city, ahead of El Barco in Albufereta at 111 metres (364 ft).

The building was designed by local architect Francisco Muñoz Llorens and completed in 1962. Besides its height, the building is also distinguished by the geometrically designed parapets on its south face. It has 78 hotel rooms.

== See also ==
- Gran Sol
- El Barco, Alicante
