= Alicante Museum of Contemporary Art =

- Museo de Arte Contemporáneo de Alicante
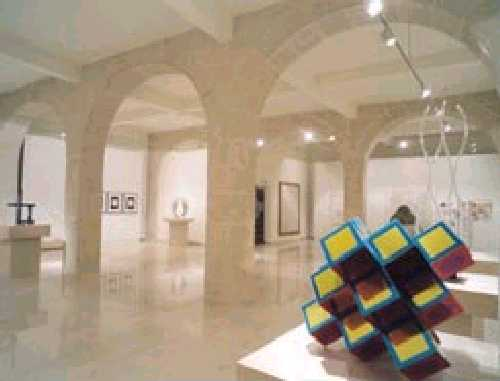
- Established: 1977
- Location: Plaza de Santa María, 3, Alicante, Spain
- Coordinates: 38°20′46.5″N 0°28′46.9″W
- Type: Art museum
- Curator: Public (city of Alicante)
- Website: www.maca-alicante.es

Alicante Museum of Contemporary Art (Spanish: Museo de Arte Contemporáneo de Alicante, MACA) is a municipal museum in Alicante, Spain. It exhibits 20th-century and contemporary art. Created in 1976 thanks to Eusebio Sempere, and reopened in 2011 after a major renovation, the museum now consists of three permanent collections of about 800 art pieces. The museum is located in Asegurada building, the oldest civil building remaining in the city.

There are three permanent collections at the museum on display:

- Collection of 20th-century art includes works by Joan Miró, Pablo Picasso, Salvador Dalí, Juan Gris, Julio González and others. It was collected by Eusebio Sempere through arduous purchases and work exchange and was generously donated to the city on 1976.
- Juana Francés Collection is composed of paintings, sketches, and other graphic works by Alicante-born Juana Francés. The collection was bequeathed to the city of Alicante by the artist, and was acquired upon her death in 1990.
- Eusebio Sempere Collection consists of various works by Eusebio Sempere from gouaches on paper to sculptures. The collection has been acquired by the city since 1997.

Not all works from the collections are on display. Only one third of the Eusebio Sempere Collection is shown at a time with rotation every three to four months.

The museum building, in turn, is another example of modern art by Spanish architects Sol Madridejos and Juan Carlos Sancho. The modern building incorporates the original Casa de la Asegurada, which is the oldest civil building in Alicante that was built in 1685. Constructed originally as a granary it has also served throughout the history as jail, powder storage, school of commerce, and once as a temporary seat of City Hall. The original building is a notable example of Alicante's baroque architecture.
