= Gravina Museum of Fine Arts =

Coordinates: 38°20′44″N 0°28′46.8″W

Gravina Museum of Fine Arts Museo de Bellas Artes Gravina
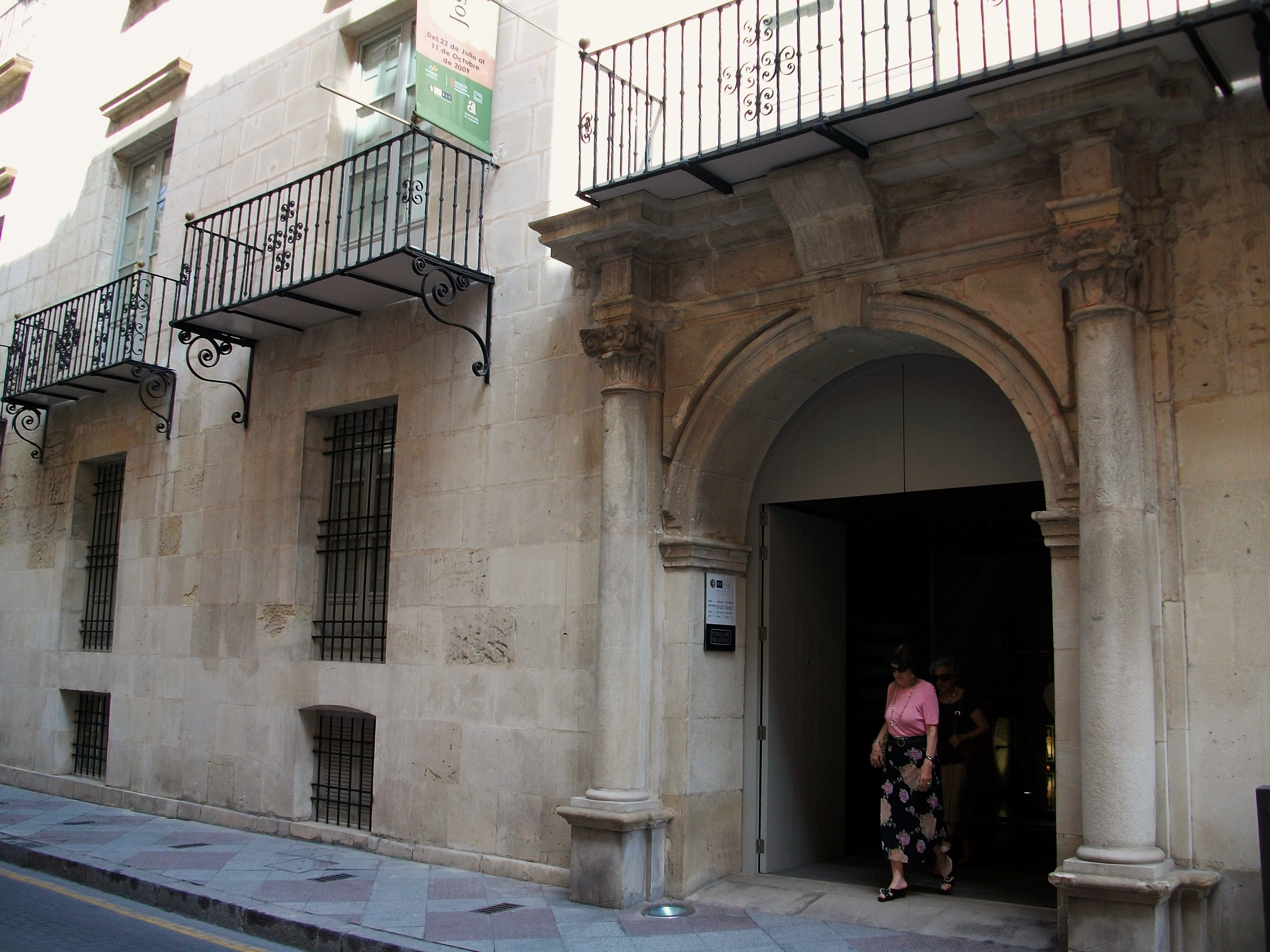
- entry to the museum
- Established: 2001
- Location: C/ Gravina 13-15, Alicante, Spain
- Type: Art museum
- Curator: Public (Diputación de Alicante)
- Website: www.mubag.es

Gravina Museum of Fine Arts (Spanish: Museo de Bellas Artes Gravina, MUBAG) is a museum in the city of Alicante, Spain, located in the Palacio del Conde de Lumiares, a four floor building constructed between 1748 and 1808 and declared a historical monument.

The museum is devoted to painting and sculpture of Alicante from the sixteenth century to the early decades of the twentieth century. In the museum there are nearly 500 works from funds of the provincial council, including a sculpture by Francisco Salzillo, and a portrait of Ferdinand VII by Valencian painter Vicente López Portaña. The museum has also several works of the most important regional painters of the nineteenth century: Antonio Gisbert, Joaquín Agrasot, Lorenzo Casanova, and Fernando Cabrera Cantó. These works reflect the major trends of the nineteenth century: historicism, customs, portraits, landscapes.
