= Castrum Album =

Coordinates: 38.363866°N 0.438928°W

Castrum Album was an ancient city of Hispania Tarraconensis, mentioned only by Livy. It is generally identified with the ancient settlement of Lucentum (formerly Akra Leuke) in modern Alicante, Spain.
