= El Barco, Alicante =

El Barco
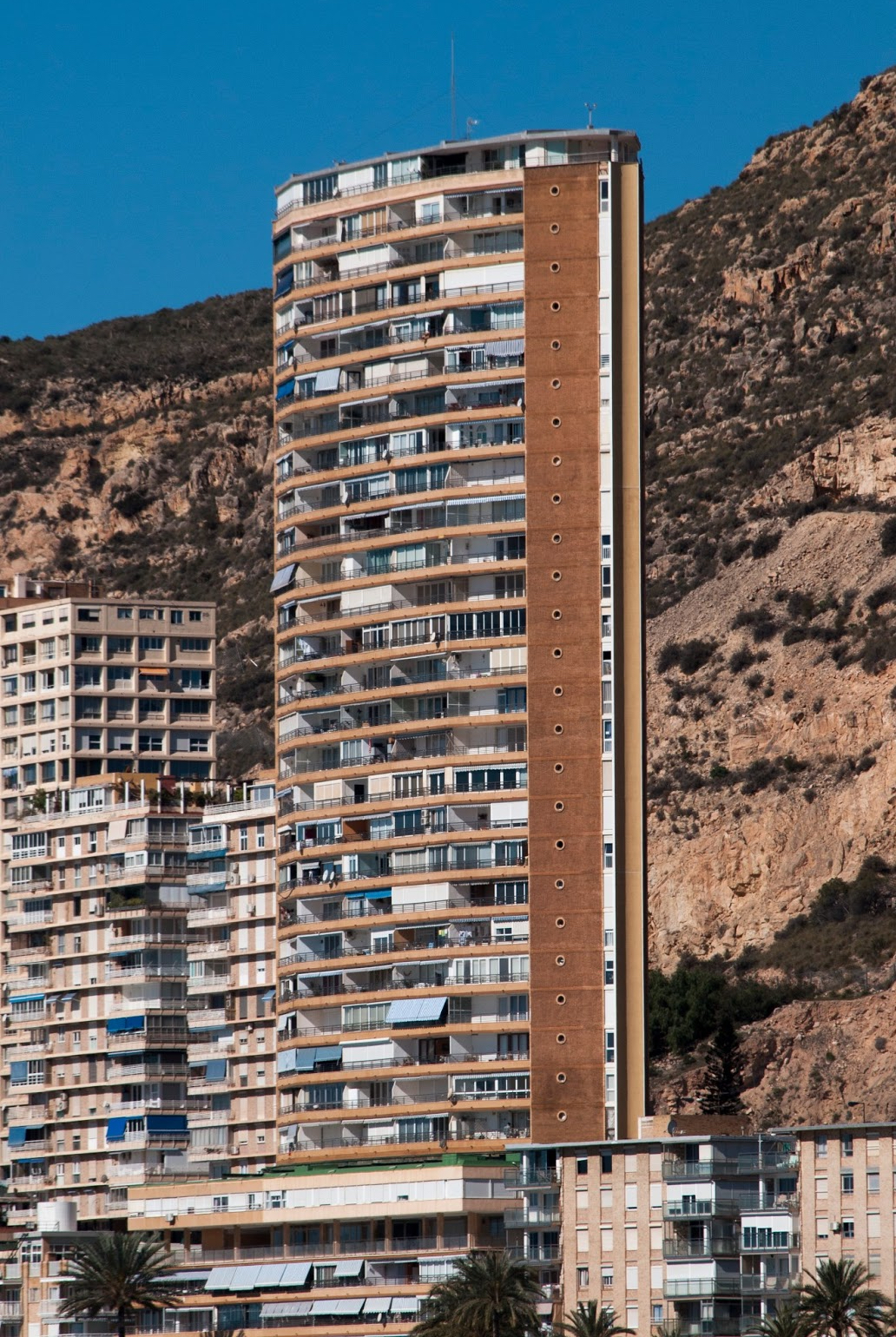
- Interactive map of the El Barco area
- Alternative names: Torre Vistamar de la Albufereta

General information
- Location: Carrer Sol Naciente 18, Albufereta, Alicante, Spain
- Coordinates: 38.360711°N 0.449646°W

Height
- Height: 111 metres (364 ft)

Technical details
- Floor count: 30

El Barco (The Ship) is a residential apartment tower in Albufereta, Alicante, Spain. It is formally called Torre Vistamar de la Albufereta, meaning "Albufereta Sea View Tower".

El Barco was one of a cluster of buildings erected in the former village of Albufereta for "Pied-Noirs", or residents from France and other European countries, in Francoist Spain. It was completed in 1963. The building was designed by Juan Guardiola, inspired by the Pirelli Tower designed by Giò Ponti in Milan. It takes its common name from its boat-shaped floor plan. El Barco is one of the most distinctive buildings of Alicante. It has an unusual lattice-work facade protecting the rear wall and windows, which was preserved during renovations completed in 2011.

As of 2013 El Barco ranked in height as #370 in Europe and #34 in Spain. At 111 metres (364 ft) El Barco is the second tallest building in Alicante, after Estudiotel Alicante at 117 metres (384 ft). The third tallest is Gran Sol at 97 metres (318 ft).

In December 2006 the building was effectively isolated from vehicle access when the Sol Naciente access road collapsed, requiring construction of a new retaining wall along the beach.
