= Asunción Valdés =

Spanish journalist (born 1950)

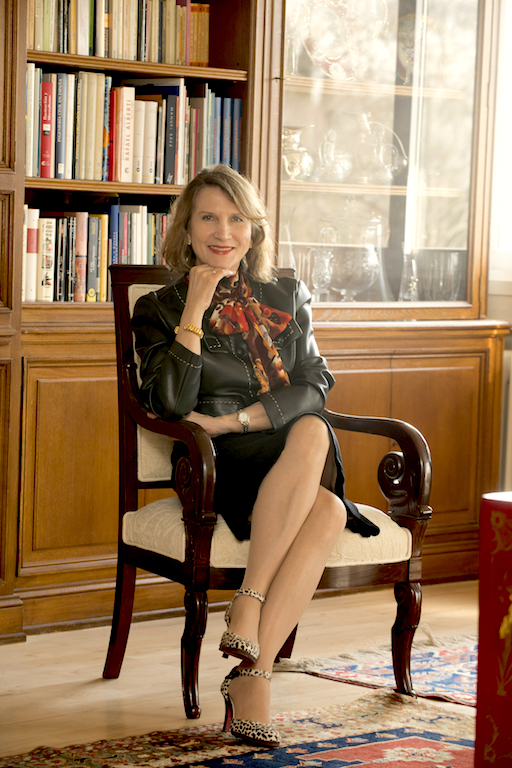
- Born: 1950 (age 75–76); Alicante, Spain
- Education: Pontifical University of Salamanca
- Occupation: Journalist

Asunción Valdés Nicolau (born 1950) is a Spanish journalist. In 1983 she became the first woman to direct and edit a television news program in Spain. In 1993 she was appointed Director of Media Relations for the Royal Household of Spain, the first woman to hold such a high position with the Head of State.

== Biography ==
Valdés earned a degree in political science and a journalism title from the Complutense University of Madrid in 1972, and a Diploma of Advanced Studies in social sciences from the Pontifical University of Salamanca in 2007. In 1973 she obtained a scholarship for postgraduate studies at the College of Europe in Bruges, the prestigious institution which was founded by Salvador de Madariaga.

After her stay in Bruges, Valdés moved to Brussels to pursue internships at the European Economic and Social Committee and the European Commission. She earned a diploma in political sociology at the Centro de Estudios Políticos y Constitucionales in Madrid in 1980. She is a fellow of the German Marshall Fund of the United States.

She began her professional career in 1972, with Información. Later, she joined La Verdad, both newspapers in her native city of Alicante.

In 1975, she began broadcasting on Radio Exterior. In January 1976 she was one of the journalists who put together the first edition of El País, working as International Economic Editor.

In 1977, she moved to Bonn as a correspondent of Radio Nacional de España, and remained in West Germany until 1982, when she became the station's correspondent in Brussels. In Bonn she was vice president of the Association of the Foreign Press in Germany (Verein der Ausländische Presse in Deutschland).

In February 1983, Valdés returned to Spain to take charge of the first edition of Telediario on Televisión Española (TVE), becoming the first woman to direct and edit a newscast. In September 1983 she resigned following an interview with alleged murderers, on the grounds that the principle of presumption of innocence had been violated. In 1984 she was the first director of En portada, a reporting program that she directed until 1985, also on TVE.

From 1986 to 1992, she headed the European Parliament's office in Madrid, a position that she won through competition with more than 400 candidates. During these six years, she worked closely with the Presidents of the European Parliament, Lord Henry Plumb and Enrique Barón Crespo.

On 1 February 1993, she was appointed Director of Media Relations for the Royal Household of Spain, with the rank of general director, a position which she held until June 2003. She was the first woman to hold such a high position with the Head of State, that is, of the entire Royal Family.

In December 2003, at the proposal of H.M. The Queen, she was appointed a member of the board of the Reina Sofía Foundation, a philanthropic organization that she continued to serve with, after leaving the Royal Household, on its Advisory Council.

The first professional activity Valdés took on at the end of her decade at the Palace of Zarzuela in June 2003 was as a member of the advisory board of Ernst & Young Spain. Also on the board were prominent personalities such as former Prime Minister Leopoldo Calvo-Sotelo, his ex-Secretary General Luis Sánchez-Merlo, and the former Governor of the Bank of Spain, Luis Ángel Rojo.

From 2004 to 2011, she was the director general of the Euroamérica Foundation under presidents Lord Tristan Garel-Jones (who was Minister of Industry and Economics), Carlos Solchaga, and the former Austrian Minister of Foreign Affairs and ex-European Commissioner Benita Ferrero-Waldner. In 2011, Valdés was appointed Director General of External Relations of Editorial Prensa Ibérica (EPI), one of the most important communication groups in Spain, whose president is Javier Moll.

She is a member of the Board of Trustees of the Luso-Spanish Foundation and a member of the Academic Council of the Master of Community Law at Charles III University of Madrid.

Since February 2017, Valdés has independently expanded her knowledge and experience in communications, the European Union, and institutions. She is a lecturer of Femmes d'Europe and a member of the advisory board of the Fundación Conexus Madrid-Comunidad Valenciana. She continues to write for various media, including Fleet People magazine.

== Awards and distinctions ==
- In 1993 she was named Importante (significant or essential) by the newspaper Información.
- In 1996 she received the Award of the Spanish Federation of Directors, Executives, Professionals, and Businesswomen (Federación Española de Directivas, Ejecutivas, Profesionales y Empresarias; FEDEPE).
- In 2000 she was recognized with the Flor Award by the Asociación Dones i Comunicaciò.
- In 2002 she received the Seco de Lucena Award of the Granada Press Association for her professional career.
- In 2003 Valdés was decorated with the Order of Charles III in recognition of her work for the Royal Household. Previously, H.M. the King had named her the Commander by Number (Enconmienda de número) of the Order of Civil Merit. She holds the tratamiento de Ilustrísima.
- In 2003 she was designated "Woman of the Epoch" by the magazine Época.
- In 2004 she was made a Knight of the Legion of Honour of France by President Jacques Chirac.
- Since October 2006, a street in Alicante has been named "Periodista Asunción Valdés".
- In 2014 she received the Hermes Award of the Association of Viewers, Radio Listeners, and Media Consumers of the Valencian Community (Asociación de Telespectadores, Radioyentes y Consumidores de Medios de la Comunidad Valenciana; ATR).
- In 2015 she was awarded the Gold Medal of Miguel Hernández University's Mediterranean Protocol Institute.
