= Port of Alicante =

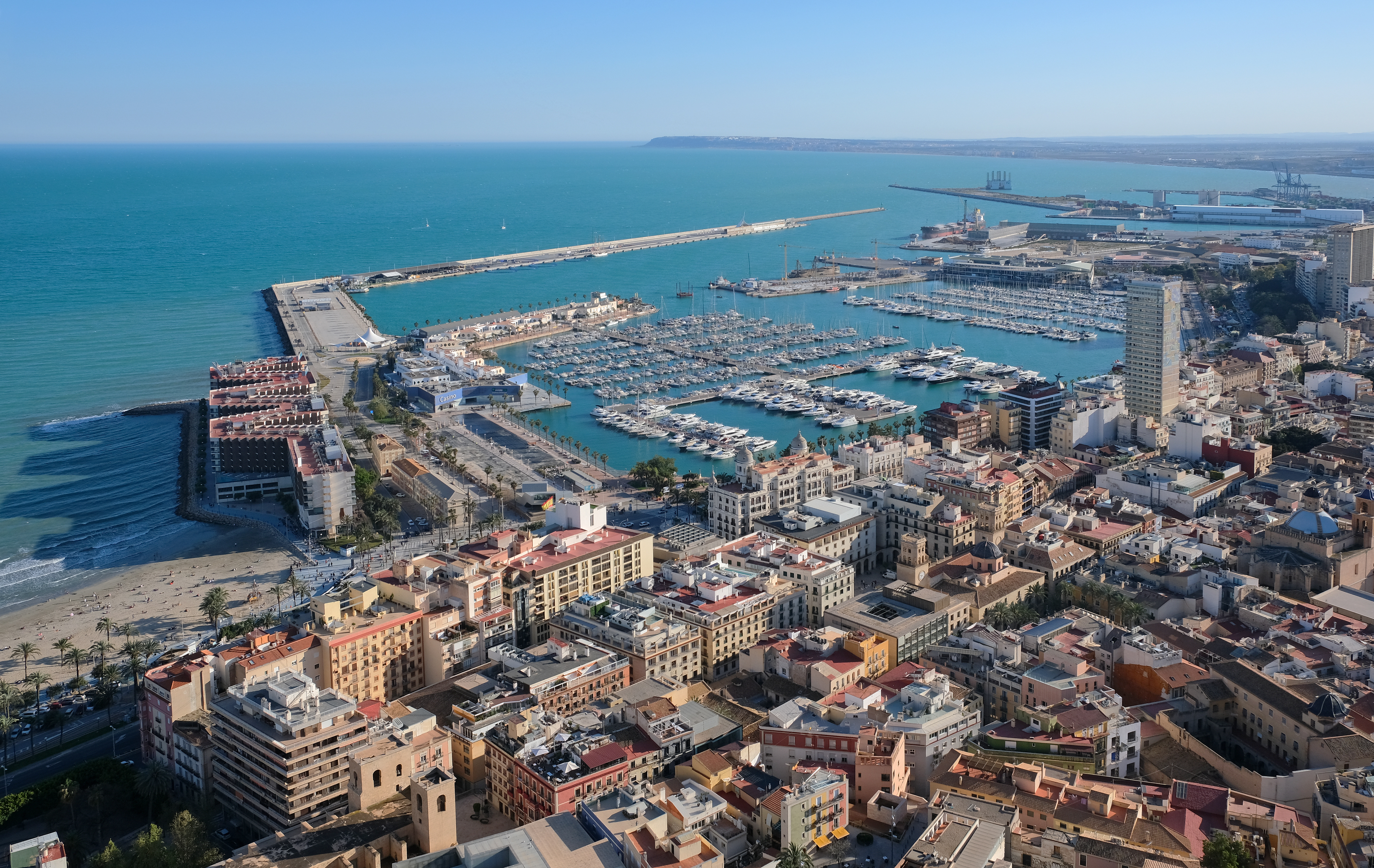
- Harbour
- Click on the map for a fullscreen view

Location
- Country: Spain
- Location: Alicante
- Coordinates: 38°20′13″N 0°29′19″W
- UN/LOCODE: ESALC

Details
- Owned by: Port Authority of Alicante
- Type of harbour: Natural/Artificial
- President: Director General: Miguel Antonio Campoy; Juan Ferrer Marsal

Statistics
- Annual cargo tonnage: 3,000,000 tonnes (2000)
- Annual container volume: 113,000 TEU's (2000)
- Website www.puertoalicante.com

The Port of Alicante is a seaport in Alicante, Spain on the Mediterranean Sea used for commercial and passenger traffic. The port is administered by the Port Authority of Alicante.
