= Antoni Egea =

Spanish artist

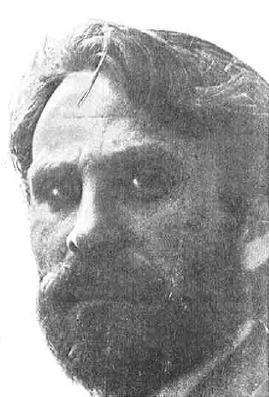
Antoni Egea

Antoni Egea (1938 in Alicante – July 1977 in Vallgorguina) was a contemporary Spanish artist. He began his career as an artist heavily influenced by Arte Povera. He studied at the School of Arts and Crafts in Barcelona. At that time he made several drawings with wax, sand and other types of clays or even scrap, incorporating other waste materials found on the streets.

His bigger and last artwork was a big mural done at Vallgorguina, 10 x 2 meters. He died the next day to terminate it in an automobile accident. At that time he was preparing his first solo exhibition at Espai 10 of the Fundació Joan Miró, held posthumously.
