= Lorenzo Carbonell Santacruz =

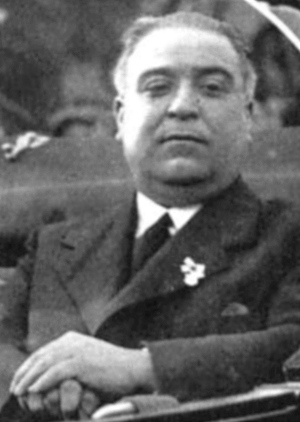
Image of Lorenzo Carbonell

Lorenzo Carbonell Santacruz (Catalan: Llorenç Carbonell i Santacruz) (Alicante, 1883—1968) was the mayor of Alicante between 1931 and 1936.

He was a member of the Republican Youth of Alicante and was elected to the Council of Alicante in 1909 under a Republican-Socialist coalition, before founding the Radical Republican Socialist Party (RRSP) in the city.

In the 1931 municipal elections, 81% of the votes in Alicante were for the Republican-Socialist coalition, and he was unanimously elected the mayor of Alicante.

During his term, an ambitious program of urban reform was instigated, for example the urbanisation of a part of the centre of the city that was blocking the urban expansion, creation of new ways of communication, increasing the construction of schools, and a project to urbanise the beach at San Juan, which counted on the support of the Minister of Public Works, Indalecio Prieto.
