= Francesc de Paula Castelló Aleu =

Blessed Francesc de Paula Castelló Aleu

Martyr
- Born: 19 April 1914; Alicante, Kingdom of Spain
- Died: 29 September 1936 (aged 22); Lleida, Second Spanish Republic
- Venerated in: Roman Catholic Church
- Beatified: 11 March 2001, Saint Peter's Square, Vatican City by Pope John Paul II
- Feast: 22 September (with the 232 martyrs), 29 September

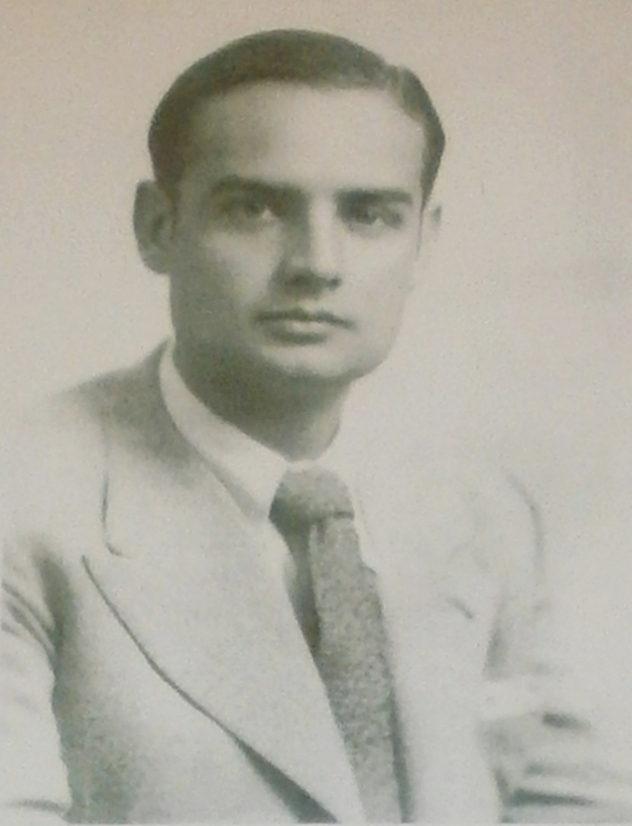
Image of Francisco Castelló in the Basilca de Santa María de Alicante

Francisco de Paula Castelló Aleu (19 April 1914 – 29 September 1936) was a Spanish Roman Catholic killed during the Spanish Civil War on false accusations of fascism. Castelló was noted for his devout and outgoing nature in addition for his activism in Christian movements such as the Catholic Action; he had friends from these movements and in one met his fiancée though his death broke their soon-to-be union. He worked as a chemist for a time prior to conscription into the armed services on the eve of the civil war.

His beatification was confirmed after Pope John Paul II – who beatified him on 11 March 2001 – acknowledged the fact that Castelló had been killed "in odium fidei" (in hatred of the faith). He was beatified as one of the 233 Spanish Martyrs.

== Life ==
Francesc de Paula Castelló Aleu was born in Alicante on 19 April 1914 as the last of three children to José Castelló and Teresa Aleu. His father died not long after his birth in June from pulmonary congestion. His two elder sisters in order were Teresa and María. He was baptized in April at the church of Santa María d'Alacant. His mother decided to relocate to Lleida in July 1914 to assume a teaching position and then in September 1922 to Juneda. He was noted for his passion and spirited nature but also could be stubborn. Castelló made his First Communion on 4 May 1924. He drew strength from the Eucharist to fight against his sometimes difficult temper and aged thirteen experienced a prolonged spiritual crisis that most did not notice.

The Marists oversaw his education from 1923 in Lleida before he studied under the Jesuits at the Chemical Institute in Barcelona. During his time at college in Oviedo he began to foster political ideas and was known to collaborate with the Jesuits from time to time. His mother died on 10 March 1929 and he and his two sisters consecrated themselves to the Mother of God. He had learned of the news of his mother's illness while at school and rushed home to be at her bedside. His mother did not recognize her children and she died just hours later. From 1931 onwards he became a member of the Federation of Young Christians of Catalonia as well as Catholic Action. Castelló worked during his period as a chemist in Lleida.

On 14 April 1930 – just before turning sixteen – he received his high school diploma with distinction and in November 1930 first met the Jesuit Román Galán who became a close friend. The latter oversaw Castelló undertaking the Spiritual Exercises of Ignatius of Loyola in 1932. Castelló also promoted the messages of the Parochial Cooperators of Christ the King that the Jesuit Francis de Paul Vallet began around that time. He received a bachelor's degree in chemistry on 6 February 1934 and he began working as an engineer in a chemical fertilization company. On 16 February 1936 it was election day and he was at home since he had not reached the legal voting age; the current climate gave reason for people (including his sister) to be anxious but he was rather idle and had said he would go out the next day to get people to enlist for the Spiritual Exercises. On 30 May 1936 he became engaged to María Pelegri (1911 – 17 June 1976); their relationship was chaste. For the engagement he gifted her with a golden scapular medal.

Misfortune reared itself just after the engagement when he was drafted on 1 July 1936 into the armed services in Lleida just before the Spanish Civil War which put the planned wedding on hold for the unforeseeable future. But on the night of 20–21 July 1936 he was imprisoned after the commander of the fort he was in awoke him and accused him of being a fascist. He was beaten with a riding crop and locked up in a former chapel with some 20 other prisoners. But he was in good spirits and was encouraging all others not to lose hope or faith. At night he would talk on the meaning of the Christian faith and its importance in everyday life.

In his imprisonment he requested testimonies in his favor from former coworkers but those men were fearful and refused to send testimonies. He was hurt from this but forgave them and hoped for their courage would be renewed. His cousin also suggested that he sign a document hiding his religious beliefs and his renouncement of his place in Christian movements. He refused this as well despite his cousin attempting several more times to persuade him.

On 12 September 1936 he was relocated to the provincial prison and he went from cell to cell to encourage recreation among other prisoners as well as the recitation of rosaries; on 23 September he was subjected to severe interrogation and on the morning of 29 September made a confession to a priest while later waving farewell to his fellow inmates. He did this for he was taken to the town hall to a so-called 'people's court' where the prosecutor asked for the death sentence. He was given the chance to defend himself but said he was proud to be a Christian and he would be glad to die for Jesus Christ. The conclusion of the trial saw the verdict given to him – the death sentence – and all those convicted prisoners were led to an underground passage to a dungeon. He entered it and encouraged the others: "Come on lads ... each of us must prepare ourselves and recommend his soul to God". He addressed a letter first to his sisters and aunt and then to his fiancée to bid them farewell; he also sent a letter to Father Galán.

On 29 September 1936 he was taken to a truck in the evening alongside six other prisoners and he began to sing but the militiamen with the prisoners slapped him to quiet him down to which Castelló said that he forgave him. He was led to the execution spot along a darkened path and he said he forgave those who were to kill him. His hands were clasped and his head was raised upwards as the order was given to which he shouted: "Long live Christ the King!" He died at 11:30pm. His heart continued to beat for mere moments after the shooting and his head leaned to the right as he crumpled to the ground. His fiancée – as per his request in his last letter to her – married and bore children and later died on 17 June 1976.

== Beatification ==
The beatification process opened in Lleida in an informative process tasked with the collection of documentation in relation to his life and this process spanned from 2 February 1959 until its closure just over a decade later on 16 May 1971; the formal introduction to the cause came under Pope John Paul II on 22 July 1986 and he became titled as a Servant of God. The Congregation for the Causes of Saints later validated the informative phase in Rome on 18 November 1991 and received the Positio dossier from the postulation in 1992 for assessment. Theological advisors approved the cause on 10 November 2000 as did the cardinal and bishop members of the Congregation for the Causes of Saints on 12 December 2000. The current postulator for this cause is Silvia Mónica Correale.
