= Eusebio Sempere =

Spanish sculptor, painter and graphic artist (1923–1985)

- Born: Eusebio Sempere Juan; 3 April 1923; Onil, Alicante, Spain
- Died: 10 April 1985 (aged 62); Onil, Alicante, Spain
- Education: Real Academia de Bellas Artes de San Carlos de Valencia
- Known for: Painting
- Notable work: "Relieves luminosos móviles" (Mobile luminous reliefs)
- Movement: kinetic art

Eusebio Sempere Juan (3 April 1923 – 10 April 1985) was a Spanish sculptor, painter, and graphic artist whose abstract geometric works make him the most representative artist of the Kinetic art movement in Spain and one of Spain's foremost artists. His use of repetition of line and mastery of color to manipulate the way light plays on the surface give depth to his pictorial compositions.

== Biography ==
Sempere was born in Onil, Alicante, Spain. He began his studies at the Real Academia de Bellas Artes de San Carlos de Valencia (Saint Charles Royal Academy of Fine Arts of Valencia) where he studied painting, drawing, and various etching techniques. Due to a childhood disease, he had almost no vision in his right eye.

In 1948, Sempere went to study in Paris, where he met Palazuelo and Chillida and other avant-garde artists such as Kandinsky and Klee. Here he came under the influence of Braque, and improved the screen printing technique he used frequently in later years. In 1955, his work was noticed by art critics at the Denise Rene Gallery and in 1956 he showed two works at the Salon des Réalités Nouvelles in Paris. In this period he was greatly impressed by Vasarely's theories of kinetic art. In Paris he also met Jean Arp and was friends with Nina Kandinsky, the painter's widow, and Roberta González, the daughter of sculptor Julio González. In 1957, he made the acquaintance of Martin Abel who worked with him years later to produce limited editions of his serigraphs.

Returning to Spain in 1959, he moved to Valencia, where art critic Aguilera Cerní, editor of Arte vivo (The Living Art) magazine, introduced Sempere to the Group Parpalló, a cultural movement not limited to the visual arts. Formed in 1957, it included artists such as Castellano, Genovés, Navarro, Soria, Michavila, Andres Alfaro, Manolo Gil, Amadeo Gabino, Isidoro Balaguer, and others striving to renew the cultural landscape in Valencia. The group published a magazine, called at first Arte vivo and later Parpalló, and began group exhibitions.

In 1964, Sempere was granted a Ford Foundation fellowship which allowed him to travel to the United States and put on an exhibition at the Bertha Schaefer Gallery, and to show his work in the Spanish Pavilion at the World's Fair in New York. In 1968, Sempere participated in a seminar at the Computer Centre of the Complutense University of Madrid on "Automatic generation of plastic forms" where he created works using computers. In 1969, he traveled again to the United States on a fellowship and there used a computer to create original art, a technique that he would continue to experiment with on his return to the University of Madrid, where he became a pioneer of this innovation in Spain.

Still exhibiting regularly at the Denise Rene Gallery in Paris, he participated in some notable public projects; the best-known examples are the sculptures and carved railings at the Museo Esculturas al Aire Libre (Museum of Outdoor Sculpture) in Madrid. Sempere persuaded his artist friends, including Pablo Serrano, Miró, and Chillida, to donate their work, much of which is spectacular, especially his own cascade that forms a centerpiece of the assembly. Sempere's work in the gardens of the Fundación Juan March (Juan March Foundation) also in Madrid, next to the concrete sculpture by Chillida, is highly regarded as well.

In 1980, he won the Gold Medal of Merit in the Fine Arts, awarded by the Ministry of Culture in Madrid, and in 1983, he was awarded the Prince of Asturias Prize for the Arts. He was officially named a favorite son of the city of Alicante and awarded an honorary doctorate by the University of Alicante. He died in April 1985 in Onil, Alicante, after a long illness.

== Work ==
Sempere's work is defined by the abstraction of its elements, geometric repetition and linearity, all of which evolved into his synthesis of Op Art and constructivism with elements of kinetic art.

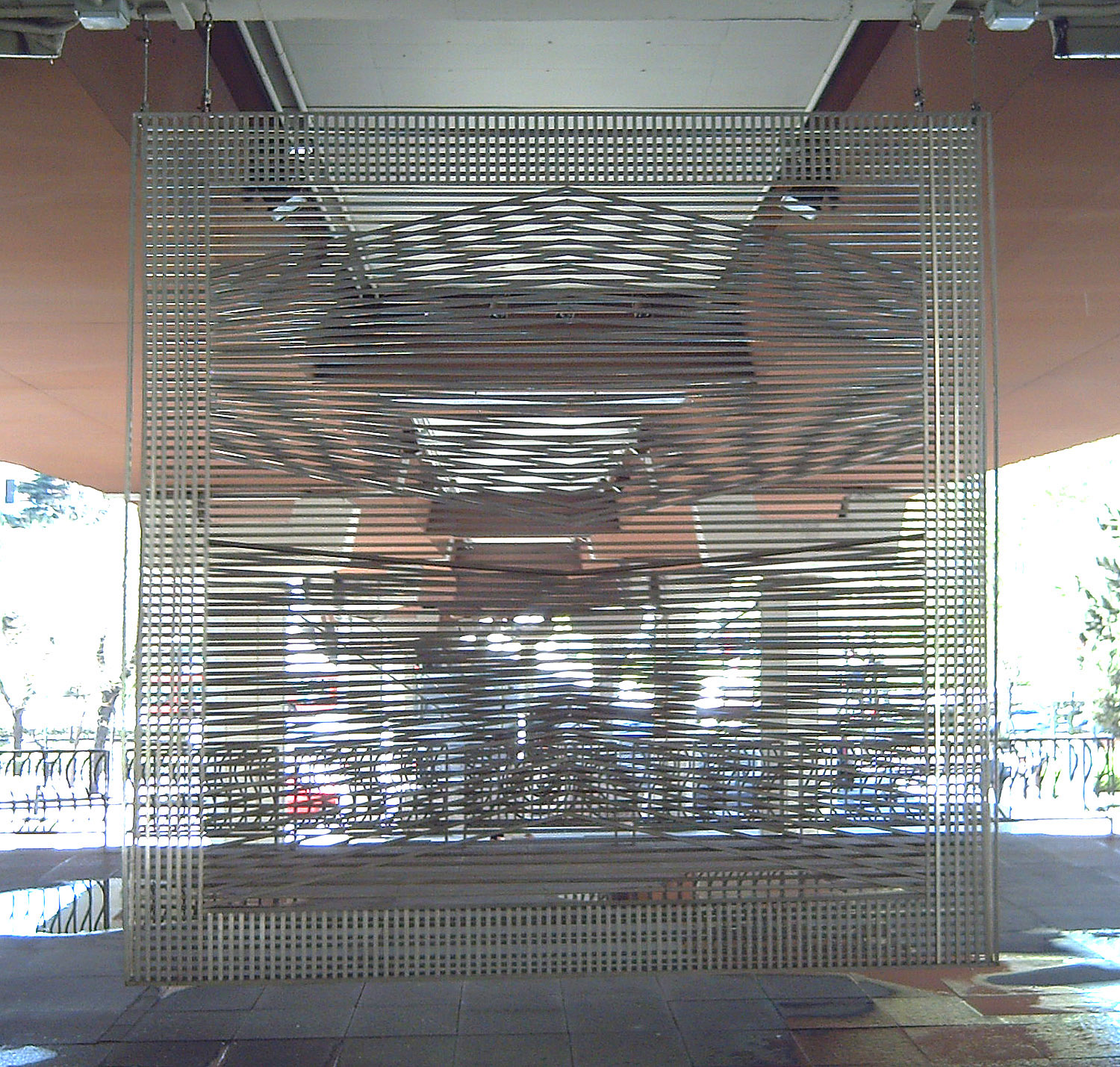
Móvil. 1972, Museo de Escultura al Aire Libre de Madrid.

His personal contribution to the development of kinetic art is a series of abstract geometric constructions that demonstrate the perceptual effects of optical vibration and the illusion of motion. Light also plays an important role in his artistic work. Perhaps influenced by Levantine sources, Sempere uses it as the main element to organize his creations harmoniously. His paintings are considered as two-dimensional surfaces where the artist plays with visual elements—light, colors and tones—using perceptual and optical effects to create suggestive forms in repeating geometric shapes.

Sempere worked in many different media, from drawings, gouaches, oil paintings, and silk screen prints to sculptures of iron and stainless steel. Two of his works can be seen in the Museum of Outdoor Sculpture in Madrid, for which he created the rails, now painted blue, which suggest a moiré pattern when walking beside them, and a mobile which he had loaned to the museum.

The Alicante Museum of Contemporary Art (Museo Alicantino de Arte Contemoraneo) contains the collection of 20th-century art donated by Sempere to the city in 1978. It is located in Alicante's oldest civil building, the Casa de la Asegurada, which dates to 1685. The nucleus of the collection contains works by Spanish artists of the 1950s: Alfaro, Canogar, Chillida, Joan Castejón, Mompó, Saura, Tàpies, Zobel and Viola. Overall, it includes these and more than 500 pieces comprising paintings, sculptures, mixed media and lithographs by other Spanish and foreign artists such as Dalí, Picasso, Millares, Serrano, Miró, Gris, Kandinsky, Chagall and Vasarely, and covering all stages of Sempere's own career.

Sempere's outdoor sculpture of metal rods at the Juan March Foundation in Madrid inspired two Spanish physicists to develop a new method for cancelling noise. Discussing the mechanics of sound attenuation over beers, they realized that the sculpture might reveal an optimum arrangement of materials that dampens noise not by absorbing it, but by interfering with the transmission of sound waves.

== Exhibitions ==
- 1949: exhibition at Mateu Art Gallery, Valencia
- 1961: first exhibition in Madrid in the Ateneo
- 1965: exhibited in Madrid in Juana Mordót Gallery
- 1972: exhibition at the Egam Gallery in Madrid
- 1975: exhibition at Rayuela Gallery in Madrid
- 1980: retrospective exhibition organized by the Ministry of Culture
- 1985: show of his graphic work 1946–1982, Banco de Bilbao, Bilbao
- 1998: retrospective exhibition at the IVAM, Valencia
- 2000: exhibition of his landscapes at the Museu Fundación Juan March, Palma and 2001 at the Museo de Arte Abstracto Español, Cuenca
- 2018: retrospective exhibition at Museo Nacional Centro de Arte Reina Sofía, Madrid
- 2018: exhibition of works in the collection of the Fundación Juan March at the Museo de Arte Abstracto Español, Cuenca

== Museums ==
- Valencian Institute of Modern Art IVAM, Valencia
- Museo Nacional Centro de Arte Reina Sofia
- Modern Art Museum of Barcelona
- Abstract Art Museum of Cuenca
- Fogg Museum, Harvard University, USA
- Museum of Modern Art MOMA, New York
- Museum of Hamburg, Germany
- Fundación Juan March, Madrid
- MUA, Museum of the University of Alicante
- Museum of Contemporary Art of Alicante (MACA)
- Coleccion Masaveu, Spain

== Awards ==
- 1964 - Ford Fellowship International Institute of New York
- 1980 - Gold Medal for Merit in Fine Arts, Ministry of Culture, Madrid
- 1983 - Prince of Asturias Prize for the Arts
- 1983 - Prize Alfons Roig, Council of Valencia
