= Ricardo Llorca =

Spanish-American composer

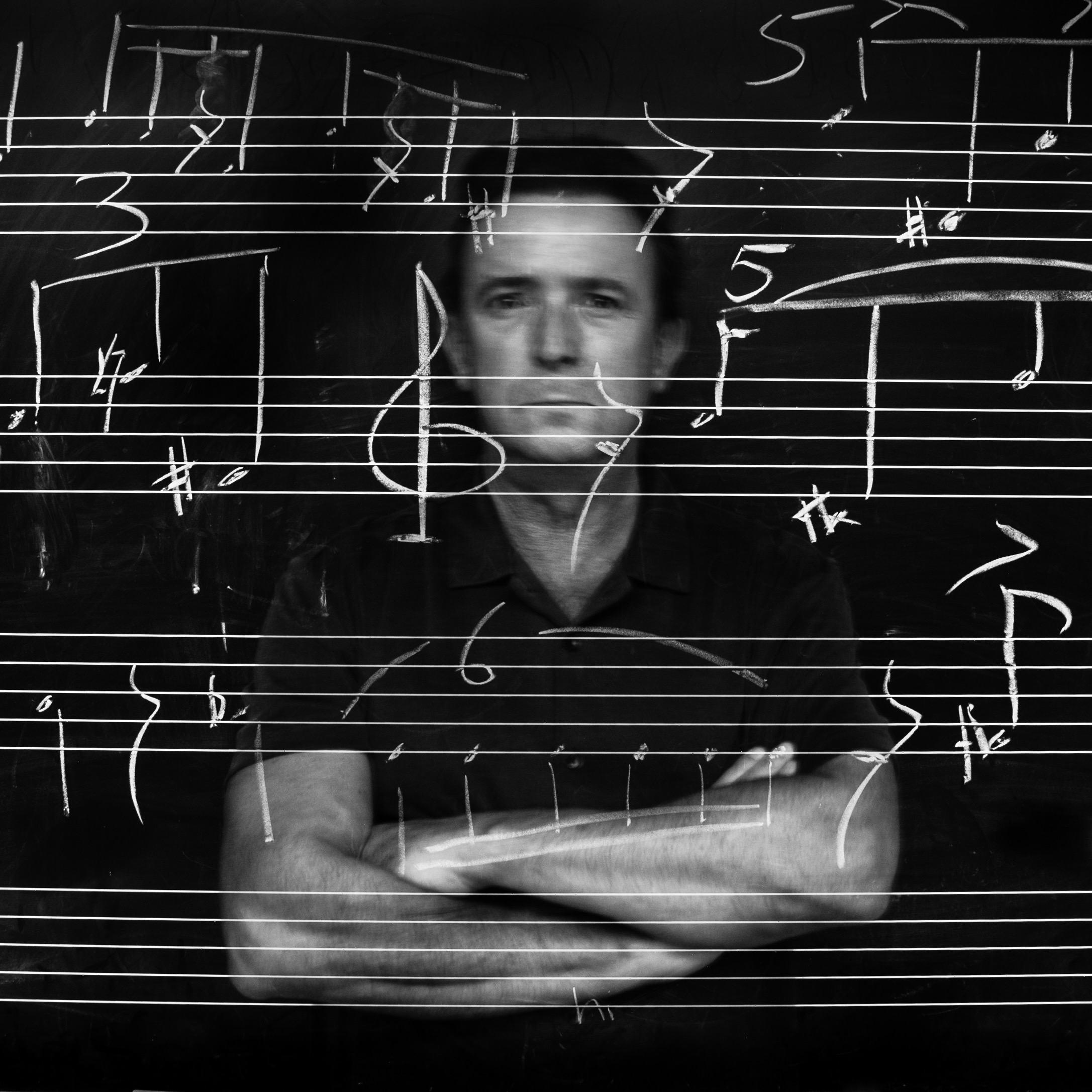
Image by Marie Therese de Belder

Ricardo Llorca (born 1958, Alicante) is a Spanish-American composer based in New York City since 1988. Llorca is a Juilliard School graduate and a faculty member of "The Juilliard School of Music Evening Division" since 1995. In addition, he is a Composer-in-residence for the New York-based contemporary dance company Henning Rübsam's Sensedance " and a composer-in-residence of NYOS ("The New York Opera Society") since 2008. His work includes operas such as "Las Horas Vacías" ("The Empty Hours") and the opera "Tres Sombreros de Copa " ("Three Top Hats"). Llorca is also a composer of symphonic, chamber, choral, and music for theater, movies, and television. Some of Ricardo Llorca's sources for his thematic inspiration are taken from his Mediterranean roots, mixed with elements of contemporary music.

== Career ==
=== Cultural management ===
Throughout his career, Ricardo Llorca has fostered partnerships with public and private institutions to advance the appreciation of contemporary and classical music. Since 2008 he has been working as Composer-in-Residence and deputy director at The New York Opera Society, collaborating with Jennifer Cho in organizing concerts and cultural events, seeking sponsorships, programming and selecting artists, etc. Examples of this are the four seasons in which he has organized, through NYOS, the Christmas Concerts of the Italian Embassy in Washington DC; various chamber music recitals at the Smithsonian Museum and the National Gallery in Washington DC; the World Financial Center in New York City; the United Nations Dag Hammarskjold Auditorium; the Chicago Cultural Center; the Teresa Carreño Auditorium in Caracas; the Sao Pedro Theater in São Paulo, the Tapia Theater and the Ibero-American Festival of Arts in Puerto Rico, among others.

Also since 1994 he has been a music programmer and member of the Cultural Committee of the Queen Sofia Spanish Institute in New York City where he has organised recitals and concerts with figures such as Giuliano Belotti, Mac McClure, Nancy Fabiola Herrera, Veronica Villarroel, Rosa Torres- Pardo, Carmen Bravo de Mompou, Alex Garrobé, etc.

== Style ==
In the words of the author: "We composers do not necessarily have to explain what we do, since many times what we write is nothing more than a mere product of our intuition and not of reflection. Also, when we compose we have to forget about the technique, as much as we can, and get carried away by what we want to express at a given time. I also try to move away from composing "collages" or any other obvious form of "eclecticism" trying to achieve a unity of language, a solid structure from the beginning to the end of the work. Then, there is no doubt that in recent years artistic trends have been less and less radical. Looking back, specifically to the 1980s, one can recognise a wide movement towards a more traditional and conservative orientation among composers of different temperaments and stylistic ideas. Obviously, I am one of them".

Rubén Jordán writes in his essay "An Approach to Transfigured History": “Ricardo Llorca's music also stands out for its duality. The duality of clear formal structures and the development of materials based on intuition and traditional compositional techniques, all filtered by a hint of minimalism in which everything is relevant, fresh and brave."

Another aspect of Llorca's compositional tasks is that he is also the author of the librettos and texts of some of his works. His are the lyrics of "The Dark Side" and "Tres sombreros de Copa", and the original libretto of "Las Horas Vacías".

== Selected works ==
Since "The Dark Side", premiered in 1993 by the mezzo-soprano Cheryl Marshall at Paul Recital Hall (The Juilliard School, New York City), or "El Combat del Somni", the work of Ricardo Llorca has left its mark in the audiences and with the critics.

Later came "Three Pieces for Piano and Orchestra", a work premiered in 1999 by the Orquesta de la Radiotelevisión Española at the Monumental Theater in Madrid; the "Concerto Italiano, for flute, guitar, harpsichord and string orchestra", a work commissioned by the Centro Para La Difusión de la Música Contemporánea and premiered in 2002 at the National Auditorium in Madrid; "Three Academic Pieces for Piano": I "Sarao", II "Coral", III "Fuga", a work commissioned by the Queen Sofía Spanish Institute of New York in 2000 and premiered by Mac Maclure in the Carlos IV Hall of the Spanish Institute in New York City.

We also highlight "Thermidor" (for organ and symphony orchestra), a work commissioned by the National Orchestra of Spain premiered at the National Auditorium of Madrid in 2014. Or "Borderline ", a work commissioned by the CDNM (Centro para la Documentación National de la Música) and by the pianist Rosa Torres-Pardo.

His first opera "Las Horas Vacías" was premiered during the "XII Setmana de Música Sacra de Benidorm" in 2007, it has subsequently traveled to Berlin, Saint Petersburg, New York, São Paulo and Lithuania, and has been premiered in a stage version in November 2021 at the Teatros del Canal in Madrid, in co-production with the Teatro Real. According to critics:

His second opera is "Tres Sombreros de Copa" ("Three Top Hats"), a work commissioned by the New York Opera Society and based on the original work by Miguel Mihura. This work was premiered at the Sergio Cardoso Theater in São Paulo on 26 and 28 November 2017; and later performed at the Teatro de la Zarzuela in Madrid in 2019. The critics referred to it in the following terms: “…the illusion, tenderness, absurdity, impossible love, indecision, brilliant madness. All this fits into the delicious work of Miguel Mihura, which is now perfected with the serious, important, well-executed music of a prestigious composer and which demonstrates his undoubted quality…" or

== Awards ==
- "Richard Rogers Scholarship, 1992"
- Award "Virgen de la Almudena, 1999"
- "American Chamber Music Award, 1994"
- "John Simon Guggenheim Scholarship, 2001"

== Recordings ==
"Tres piezas para piano y orquesta" ("El Tiempo Malherido") /"RTVE Música"/ 2004 "Concierto Italiano" /"Columna Música"/2005

"Tres Piezas para Piano Académica" /Columna Música/2005 /RTVE Música /2005

"The Dark Side"/Columna Música/2005

"Las Horas Vacias - The Empty Hours" / Columna Música/ 2011

"Handeliana"/ Naxos/ 2013

== Catalog ==
Nr		Year	PREMIERE
1	"Opium" (for solo guitar) "Canalla" (for two guitars) "Zambra" (for two Guitars, soprano, baritone, percussion and string quartet)	1991	"Virginia Luque Recital". Weill Recital Hall at Carnegie Hall (New York. October 1991) "A Journey into the Spanish Music" The Juilliard Performance Programs for Schools Summer tours 1990/1991. Spring tours 1993/1994. Spring tour 1996.
2	"Odeon" (For orquestra)	1992	
3	"The Swimming Pool"/"La Piscina" (for live electronics and percussion instruments)	1993	"Composers and Choreographers" Alice Tully Hall, Lincoln Center. Electronic Instruments: Ricardo Llorca, Percussion: Samuel Cohen, David Libman, Choreographed and danced by Claudia Florian.
4	"The Dark Side" (Monodrama for mezzo-soprano and piano with text by Ricardo Llorca). (Optional version for baritone and piano).	1993	Paul Recital Hall (The Juilliard School, Lincoln Center, Nueva York). Mezzo-soprano: Cheryl Marshall. Piano: Ricardo Llorca. (4 October 1993). *Recorded by Columna Musica for the record "Concierto Italiano" ( August 2005 .) Mezzo-soprano: Nancy Herrera. Piano: Mac Maclure.
5	"Tres Piezas para piano y orquesta"/ "Three pieces for piano and orchestra". Part1 "El Tiempo Malherido"/"The Wounded Age". Part 2 "El Fin de la Inocencia"/"The End of Innocence". Part 3 "La Avalancha"/"The Avalanche".	1998	Teatro Monumental de Madrid. Conductor: Uwe Mund. Orquesta de la Radiotelevision Española. (25 November 1999). *Recorded by "RTVE Musica" for the CD "El Tiempo Malherido". Piano: Miguel Baselga. Conductor: Jose Maria de Eusebio. Orquesta de la RadioTelevision Española.
6	"El Angel Caído"/ "The Fallen Angel" (for orquestra)	1999	Auditorio Nacional de Musica de Madrid. 5 November 1999. Conductor: Jose Ramon Encinar. Orquesta Filarmónica de Madrid. *Award "Virgen de la Almudena 1999"
7	"Tres Piezas académicas para piano"/ "Three academic pieces for piano" (2000) "Sarao"/"Sarao" "Coral"/"Chorale" "Fuga"/"Fugue".	2002	"A Journey into the Spanish Music" The Spanish Institute, Nueva York. (23 April 2000) Piano: Mac McClure *Recorded by Columna Musica for the CD. "Concierto Italiano". Piano: Raimon Garriga. Also recorded by RTVE Musica for CD "El Tiempo Malherido".Piano: Ricardo Descalzo
8	"Concierto Italiano" (2001) (for peak flute, guitar, continuous clef and string orchestra). Commissioned by "La Folía", "Festival Andrés Segovia 2002" and Spanish "Centro para la Documentación de la Música Contemporánea". 1-Dell'onda ai Fieri Moti 2-Credete al mio Dolore 3-Vorrei Vendicarmi.	2001/2005	Concert: Festival Andres Segovia 2002. Auditorio Nacional de Madrid. November 2002 Soloists: Pedro Bonet (peak flute) Pablo de la Cruz (Guitar) Belen Gonzalez (Continuous clef). Orquestra "I Solisti Aquilani". *Recorded by Columna Musica for CD: "Concierto Italiano" ( 2005). Soloists: Pedro Bonet (peak flute) Alex Garrobe (Guitar) Belen Gonzalez (Continuous clef) Orquesta del Gran Teatro del Liceo. Conductor: Guerassim Voronkov.
9	"La Memoria de los Caños" (for guitar)	2004	Premiere in EEUU: "Ricardo Llorca y la musica de Cataluña" The Florence Gould Hall-Alliance Francaise, New York. October 2004. Soloist: Tali Roth. Premiere in Spain: "Ricardo Llorca y la re-invencion del Barroco". Benidorm. Iglesia de San Jaime. 19 March 2005. Soloist: Alex Garrobe.
10	"Las Danzas del Vizcaino" for hapsichord.Commissioned by "La Folia" For the Vth century of "El Quijote".	2005	Concert: "Ricardo Llorca y la re-invencion del Barroco" Benidorm. Iglesia de San Jaime. 19 March 2005 Soloist: Belen Gonzalez
11	Opera: "Las Horas Vacias"/ "Empty Hours"/ "Vertane Zeit" (2007) Music and libretto by Ricardo Llorca. Opera/Monodrama for soprano/actress, piano, choir and strings orchestra.	2007/2021	PREMIERE OF THE CONCERT VERSION: "XII Setmana de Música Sacra" Benidorm. Iglesia de San Jaime 31 March 2007. Soprano: Dorota Grezskowiak. Actress: Maria Ruiz de Apodaca. Piano: Lynn Baker .Agrupacion Coral de Benidorm. Orquesta del Julius Stern Institute de Berlin. Conductor: Matias de Oliveira. PREMIERE OF THE STAGE VERSION: Teatro Real de Madrid in coproduction with Los Teatros del Canal and in collaboration with The New York Opera Society and HighC Music. MADRID 8 November 2021 Music by Ricardo Llorca and libretto by Ricardo Llorca and Paco Gámez. ARTISTIC CREW: Woman (soprano): Sonia de Munck. Woman (actress): Mabel del Pozo. Musical Director: Alexis Soriano. Stage Director: José Luis Arellano García. Set designer: Silvia de Marta. Costume designer: Miguel Ángel Milán. Video artist: Miquel Àngel Raió. Choreographer: Chevi Muraday. Lighting: Juan Gómez-Cornejo. AAI lighting assistant: Jesús Díaz Cortés. Choir and soloists from la Orquesta Titular del Teatro Real. Pianist: Eduardo Fernández. Choir conductor: Andrés Máspero. Musical director assistant: Luis Seguí. *Recording CD LAS HORAS VACíAS/THE EMPTY HOURS. Ópera-monodrama for soprano actress, piano, choir and strings orchestra. Soprano: Laura Alonso. Actress: Angélica de la Riva. Piano: Rosa Torres-Pardo. Manhattan Choral Ensemble. The New York Opera Society orquestra. Conductor: Emmanuel Plasson.
12	"La Llum" For choir (SATB) and piano soloist, commissioned by the Manhattan Choral Ensemble.	2009	"New Music for New York" Earl Hall (Columbia University, New York). 7 March 2009. The Manhattan Choral Ensemble.
13	"El Combat del Somni" / 'The Battle of dreams" (2008) Music: Ricardo Llorca / Text: Josep Janés (three pieces for soprano and piano), later arranged for soprano, piano soloist and strings orquestra. And lastly, for violín and piano. (commissioned by Mac Maclure; The "New York Opera Society and "The Michael Phelps/John O'Brien Salon Series") 1-Mai Mes 2-La Llum 3-En Dute'm "Combat del Somni" (for violín and piano). (Commissioned by Rosa Torres-Pardo) "Combat del Somni" for soprano, violin and strings orchestra.	2008/2015	First Premiere: "The Michael Phelps/John O'Brien Salon Series/NY 2009". Soprano: Deborah Dimasi. Piano: Lynn Baker. 19/09/2009. Piano and violin premiere: Madrid / Museo Nacional Reina Sofía / Auditorio 400. Piano: Rosa Torres-Pardo. Violin: Anne Marie North. 2 September 2015. Soprano, piano and string orquestra Premier: Concierto "Solistas Mediterraneos". Auditorio de la Diputación de Alicante (ADDA) . Alicante. Soprano: Ana Maria Sanchez. Piano: Luis Seguí. Orquesta del Mediterraneo. Conductor: Jose Miguel Rodilla. 27 October 2015.
14	"Handeliana" for solo guitar, commissioned by Adam Levin.	2011	"Le Poisson Rouge" (New York City). Guitar: Adam Levin *Recording for CD "21st Century Spanish Guitar, Vol. 1". Works from Ricardo Llorca/ David del Puerto / Octavio Vázquez, etc. Guitar: ADAM LEVIN. Label: Naxos. Serie: Guitar Collection.
15	"Identifying Bodies at the Twenty-Sixth Street Pier" for choir SATB and solo tenor, commissioned by The Manhattan Choral Ensemble.	2011	Concert "Manhattan Choral Ensemble". Church of the Incarnation (New York City) 03/12/2011.
16	"Borderline" (For batucada and orquestra). Commissioned by CDNM (Centro para la Documentación Nacional de la Música) and NYOS (New York Opera Society). Later arranged for piano soloist, batucada and symphonic orquestra. (Commissioned by Rosa Torres-Pardo).	2012/2015	Auditorio 400 "Red Chair Concert Series" Museo Reina Sofía (Madrid). Orquesta del ENSEMS. Batucada Band of NYOS (New York Opera Society). Conductor:Joan Cerveró (June 4th2012). "Borderline / Al límite". Rosa-Torres Pardo, Ricardo Llorca y la JORCAM. Festival de Verano/ Auditorio de El Escorial. Piano: Rosa Torres-Pardo. Joven Orquesta de la Comunidad de Madrid. Conductor: Jose Maria Moreno (4 July 2015).
17	"Thermidor" (For organ and Symphonic orquestra).Commissioned by orquesta Nacional de España and Fundacion SGAE.	2014	Premiered by Orquesta y Coros Nacionales de España. Auditorio Nacional de Madrid. Conductor: Antonio Mendez. 17 October,18 y 19/ 2014.
18	"Cavatina". A new piano work commissioned by CDNM (Centro Nacional para la Difusión de la Música).	2016	Auditorio de la Diputación de Alicante (ADDA) by Spanish piano player Alba Ventura. 21 March 2017.
19	"Tres Sombreros de Copa"/ "Three Top Hats" A circus opera based in Miguel Mihura's 1932 theater play "Tres Sombreros de Copa" Music and lyrics: Ricardo Llorca Dialogs: Miguel Mihura	2017	International Premiere: São Paulo (Teatro Sergio Cardoso). 26 September 2017. Musical director: Alexis Soriano. Director's Assistant: Pedro Messias. Artistic Direction: Paulo Abrao Esper. Stage Director: Giorgia Massetani. Piano soloist: Rosa Torres-Pardo. Orchestra and choirs from Teatro Sergio Cardoso. Co-produced by São Paulo state government, Dinámica Agency and The New York Opera Society. European Premiere: Madrid, Teatro de la Zarzuela. 12 September 2019. A new production of Teatro de la Zarzuela in collaboration with the New York Opera Society, Inc. Musical direction: Diego Martin-Etxebarria. Stage Director: José Luis Arellano. Set designer: Ricardo Sánchez Cuerda. Orquesta de la Comunidad de Madrid. Choir Teatro de la Zarzuela. Director: Antonio Fauró.
20	"Vals de la Bailarina"/ "Ballerina´s waltz" . For piano and solo voice, commissioned by Rosa Torres-Pardo	2018	Auditorio Nacional de Madrid.13 Jan 2018. Rosa Torres-Pardo, piano. Guests artists: María Toledo (flamenco singer and piano). Rocío Márquez and Arcángel (flamenco singers).

== Music for Theatre, Cinema and Television ==
Theatre	Year
"Amor de Perlimplin con Belisa, en su Jardín". "Teatro Mix Company". Teatro Principal, Alicante	1988

Cinema	Year
"Todas Hieren". Director: Pablo Llorca. "La Bañera Roja Productions". Madrid	1997
"La Espalda de Dios". Director:Pablo Llorca. "La Bañera Roja Productions". Madrid	1999
"Expiration Date". Director:Juan Carlos García.Muvi Films Productions. Puerto Rico	2002

Documentaries	Year
"El Tratado de Odessa". Pasos en la Niebla Productions. Madrid	1987
"Mario Testino". BBC. Art Partner Productions. London	2002
