= José Perramón =

Spanish handball player (born 1946)

José Perramón Acosta (born October 17, 1946) is a former Spanish handball player. He competed in the 1972 Summer Olympics.

In 1972 he was part of the Spanish team which finished fifteenth in the Olympic tournament. He played all five matches.
