= SS Manchester City =

British cargo steamship that was a minelayer base ship in WW2

History

United Kingdom
- Name: Manchester City
- Namesake: Manchester City F.C.
- Owner: Manchester Liners
- Operator: (United Kingdom) Royal Navy (1939–45)
- Port of registry: (United Kingdom) Manchester
- Builder: Blythswood Sb Co Ltd, Scotstoun
- Yard number: 46
- Launched: 23 June 1947
- Completed: August 1937
- Commissioned: into Royal Navy, 1939
- Decommissioned: from Royal Navy, 1945
- Identification: UK official number 147429; call sign GBBP
- Fate: Scrapped in 1964

General characteristics
- Type: cargo ship
- Tonnage: 5,600 GRT, 3,329 NRT
- Length: 430.7 ft (131.3 m)
- Beam: 57.0 ft (17.4 m)
- Draught: 26 ft 4 1/2 in (8.04 m)
- Depth: 27.0 ft (8.2 m)
- Decks: 1
- Installed power: 800 NHP, 3,800 shp
- Propulsion: 1 × screw; 3 × steam turbines
- Speed: 13.5 knots (25 km/h)
- Sensors & processing systems: 1937: wireless direction finding, echo sounding device; by 1948: radar, gyrocompass
- Notes: sister ships: Manchester Progress, Manchester Trader

SS Manchester City was a British cargo steamship that was built in Glasgow in 1937 and scrapped in Faslane in 1964. The Royal Navy requisitioned her in the Second World War.

She was the second of three Manchester Liners to be named after Manchester City F.C. The first was a steamship that was built in 1898 and scrapped in 1929. The third was a motor ship that was built in 1964, sold and renamed in 1971, and scrapped in 1985.

== Building and identification ==
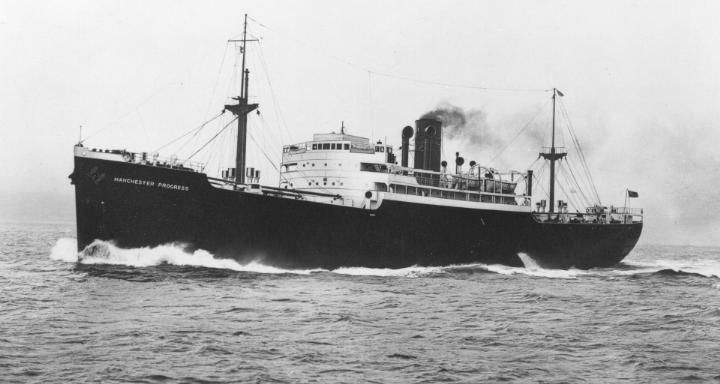
Manchester City's identical sister ship Manchester Progress

Between 1937 and 1941 the Blythswood Shipbuilding Company built three sister ships at its shipyard in Scotstoun, Glasgow, for Manchester Liners. Manchester City was built as yard number 46, launched on 23 June 1937, and completed that August. Manchester Progress was launched and completed in 1938, and Manchester Trader was launched and completed in 1941.

Manchester City's registered length was 430.7 ft (131.3 m), her beam was 57.0 ft (17.4 m) and her depth was 27.0 ft (8.2 m). Her tonnages were 5,600 GRT and 3,329 NRT.

She had a single screw, driven via single-reduction gearing by three steam turbines built by David Rowan & Co of Glasgow. Between them, the three turbines were rated at a total of 800 NHP or 3,800 shp, and gave her a speed of 13.5 knots (25 km/h).

Manchester Liners registered Manchester City at Manchester. Her UK official number was 147429 and her wireless telegraph call sign was GBBP.

== Service ==
In 1939 the Admiralty requisitioned Manchester City. One source claims that she was converted into a minelayer, but another says she became a "minelayer base ship". In September 1940 the Royal Navy sent Manchester City to Iceland, which the UK had occupied since that May.

In 1945 the Admiralty returned Manchester City to her owners. By 1948 her navigation equipment included radar and a gyrocompass. On 15 May 1964, she arrived at Faslane on Gare Loch to be scrapped.

== Bibliography ==
- Burrell, David (1992). Furness Withy 1891–1991. Kendal: World Ship Society. ISBN 0-905617-70-3.
- Lloyd's Register of Shipping (PDF). Vol. II.–Steamers and Motorships of 300 Tons Gross and Over. London: Lloyd's Register of Shipping. 1938 – via Southampton City Council.
- Lloyd's Register of Shipping. Vol. II. M–Z Steamers, Motorships, Sailing Vessels, &c. London: Lloyd's Register of Shipping. 1948 – via Internet Archive.
- Mercantile Navy List. London. 1938 – via Crew List Index Project.
