= SS Stanbrook =

British cargo steamship sunk in 1939

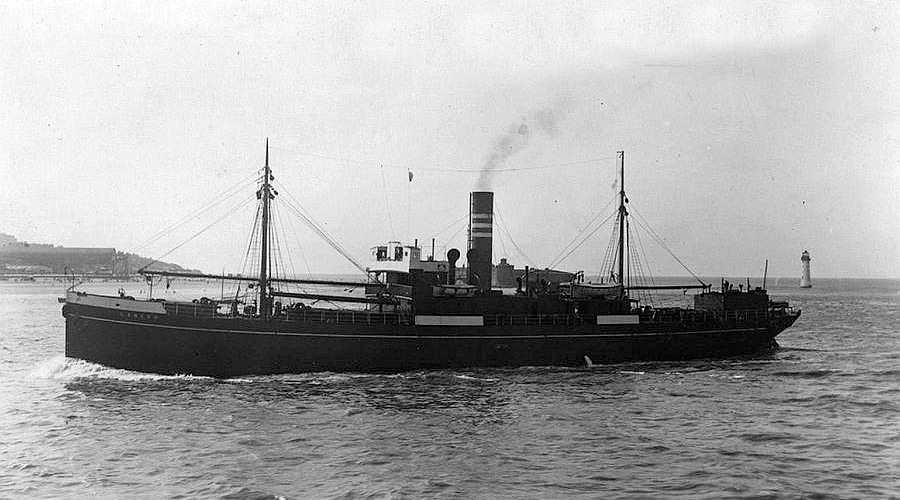
- The ship as Lancer in 1909

History
- Name: 1909: Lancer; 1937: Stanbrook; 1937: Polyfloisvios; 1937: Stanbrook
- Namesake: 1909: Lancer
- Owner: 1909: Fisher, Renwick & Co; 1937: Stanhope SS Co Ltd; 1937: GM Mavroleon; 1937: Stanhope SS Co Ltd
- Operator: 1909: Manchester–London Steamers; 1937: JA Billmeir & Co Ltd
- Port of registry: 1909: (United Kingdom) Manchester; 1937: (United Kingdom) London; 1937: (Greece) Piraeus; 1937: (United Kingdom) London
- Builder: Tyne Iron SB Co, Willington Quay
- Yard number: 172
- Launched: 16 August 1909
- Completed: September 1909
- Identification: 1909: UK official number 124287; 1909: code letters HPRT; 1934: call sign MDBG; 1937: call sign MMST
- Fate: sunk by torpedo, 19 November 1939

General characteristics
- Type: cargo steamship
- Tonnage: 1,363 GRT, 851 NRT
- Length: 230.1 ft (70.1 m)
- Beam: 34.0 ft (10.4 m)
- Draught: 18 ft 11 in (5.77 m)
- Depth: 21.8 ft (6.6 m)
- Decks: 1
- Installed power: 1 × triple-expansion engine, 163 NHP
- Propulsion: 1 × screw
- Speed: 11 knots (20 km/h)
- Crew: 21

SS Stanbrook was a British cargo steamship. She was launched in 1909 as Lancer, and was renamed Stanbrook in 1937. She was a blockade runner in the Spanish Civil War, in which she survived a number of Nationalist air attacks. One of these sank her in August 1938, but she was raised and repaired. In March 1939 she was one of the last blockade runners to leave Republican-held Spain before it fell to the Nationalist faction. In November 1939 a German U-boat sank Stanbrook with all hands in the North Sea.

== Building ==
The Tyne Iron Shipbuilding Company built the ship at Willington Quay on the River Tyne as yard number 172. She was launched on 16 August 1909 as Lancer for Fisher, Renwick and Company's Manchester–London Steamers, Ltd, and completed that September.

Lancer's registered length was 230.1 ft (70.1 m), her beam was 34.0 ft (10.4 m), and her depth was 21.8 ft (6.6 m). Her tonnages were 1,363 GRT and 851 NRT. She had a single screw, driven by a three-cylinder triple-expansion engine built by the North East Marine Engine Company Ltd of Newcastle upon Tyne. It was rated at 163 NHP, and gave her a speed of 11 knots (20 km/h).

== Lancer ==
Fisher, Renwick registered Lancer at Manchester. Her UK official number was 124287 and her code letters were HPRT. By 1930 she was equipped for wireless telegraphy. By 1934 her call sign was MDBG, and this had superseded her code letters.

== Stanbrook ==
In 1937 a London shipowner, Jack Billmeir, bought Lancer for hips Stanhope Steamship Company, renamed her Stanbrook, and registered her in London. During the course of 1937, ownership of Stanbrook briefly passed to the Greek ship-owner GM Mavroleon, who renamed her Polyfloisvios, and registered her in Piraeus. It then returned to the Stanhope SS Co, which reverted her name to Stanbrook. When she returned to the UK registry, her call sign was changed again, to MMST.

Billmeir was expanding his fleet of tramp ships to trade with the Spanish Republic. This was blockade running; evading the Nationalist faction of the Spanish Navy, and it also risked Nationalist air attacks when in Republican ports. In April 1937, Stanbrook, with a Captain Prance as her Master, took a cargo of grain to Republican-held Bilbao. She called at Saint-Jean-de-Luz on the Atlantic coast of France, and on 22 April left port in convoy with two other UK cargo ships; Hamsterley and Macgregor. The next morning, the Nationalist cruiser Almirante Cervera and a naval trawler tried to intercept them, but the Royal Navy intervened with the battleship HMS Hood and destroyer HMS Firedrake. All three cargo ships reached Bilbao, whence Captain Prance sent Billmeir a wireless telegraph message that claimed "Passage from St. Jean uneventful. No sign of mines or Franco."

On 24 January 1938, Stanbrook left Malta in ballast for Odesa in the Soviet Union, where she loaded a cargo that she took to the Spanish Republic. After discharging her cargo in Spain she went in ballast to Bône in Algeria, where she arrived in 1 March. There a cargo was transhipped from the Spanish steamship Escolano to Stanbrook, which took the cargo to Spain.

On 30 April 1938 Stanbrook was one of a dozen UK merchant ships in Barcelona. There were two Nationalist air raids on the port that day, and most of the UK ships were damaged. One member of Stanbrook's crew was wounded, and was taken to the English Hospital in Barcelona for treatment. On 10 June 1938 seven UK shipmasters submitted a written protest to the British Consul in Barcelona about the air attacks on their ships. The seven included Captain G Davies, who at the time was Stanbrook's Master.

On 19 August 1938 Stanbrook was lying off Vallcarca, south of Barcelona, with a cargo of cement, when she suffered two Nationalist air attacks. In the first attack, one bomb hit her bridge, and another holed her No. 1 hold below the waterline. She was slowly sinking, so her crew tried to beach her, but failed. In the second attack, one bomb holed her below the waterline in No. 2 hold, causing her lit heavily, and settle by the head, until her bow came to rest on the seabed in shallow water. Her cargo of cement was ruined, but none of her crew was harmed. On 23 August she was refloated and towed to Barcelona, where she was dry docked and repaired.

On 9 February 1939 Stanbrook and another Stanhope ship, Stanforth, were in Valencia unloading cargoes of food when there was a Nationalist air raid on the port. Both ships were damaged by shrapnel.

=== Refugees from Alicante ===
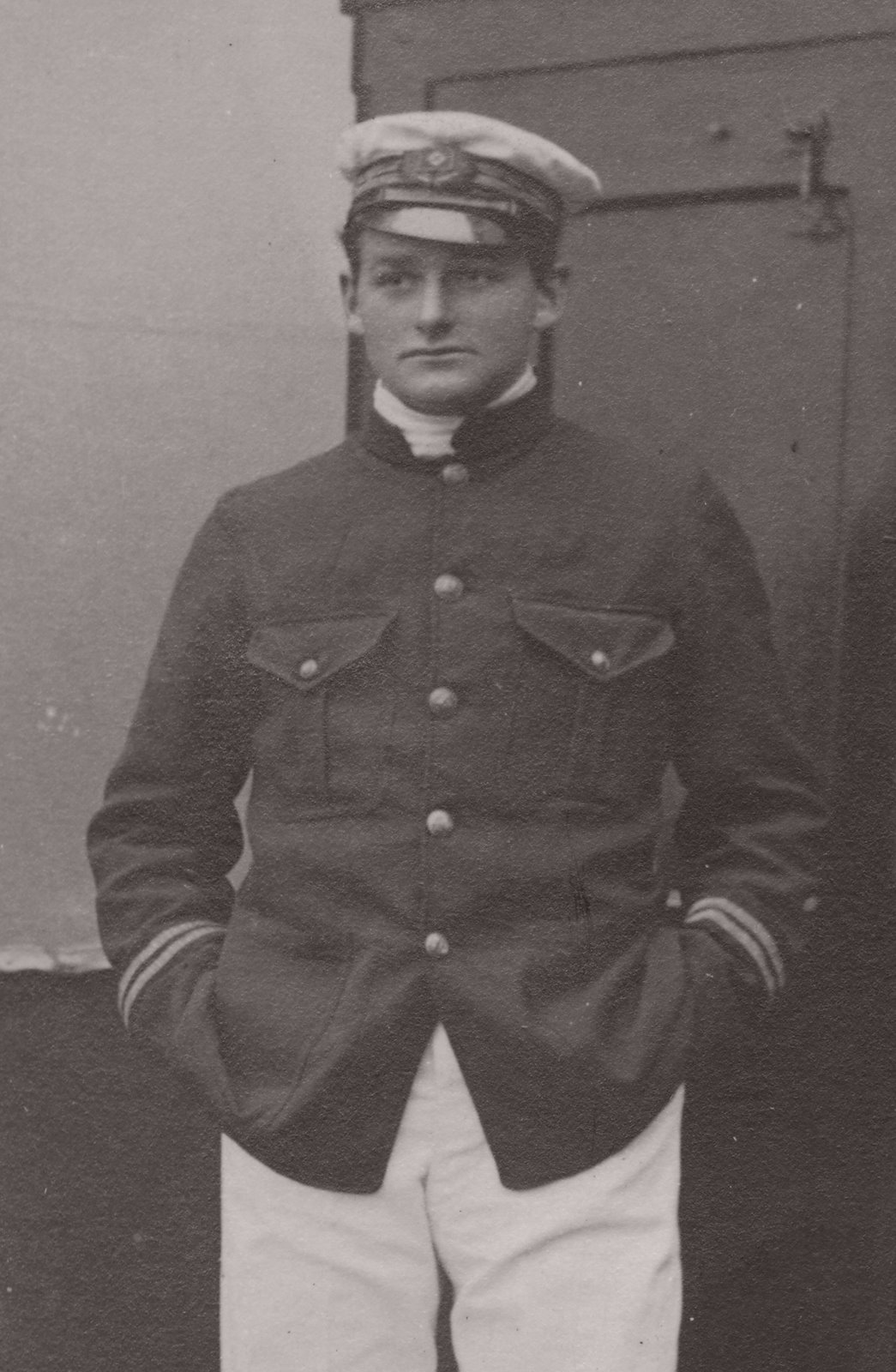
Archibald Dickson earlier in his career, when he was a Second Officer

On 28 March 1939 Stanbrook was in Alicante, waiting to load a cargo of oranges and saffron. By now a different captain, Archibald Dickson, was her Master. Thousands of refugees were in Alicante to flee the advancing Nationalist forces, but Billmeir had given an order not to embark any of them. Dickson decided to disobey orders, and embark as many refugees as possible.

One passenger, Antonio Vilanova, was a customs officer who late wrote the book Los Olvidados about Republican refugees while in Mexico. In a letter to a friend he described the embarkation

"In everyone’s mind there was a feeling that we were fleeing, of defeat, of moral collapse. When we got to the boat, we were received among the protests of the passengers who were already there. As we boarded, some sat on the deck, others in the hold or in the bilge. There was no space, but people continued to board."

Helia González, who at the time was a 4 year old girl, later recounted:

"We arrived at the port by train from Elche. Once we arrived, an extremely long queue separated us from a boat that to me seemed enormous. It had a strange name and was full of people. Just like everyone else, we feared not being able to reach the gangway that would lead us onto the ship. "Finally, we arrived at the boat. A pair of strong arms lifted me up. I saw a smiling face, a sailor’s cap and he gave me a kiss on the cheek. He didn’t say a word, but that embrace, that look, they promised something good... It was him, Dickson, and we weren’t in danger any more."

Dickson described what he saw in Alicante, and explained why he decided to embark the refugees, in a letter to the Sunday Dispatch published on 4 April 1939:

"Amongst the refugees were all classes of people, some of them appearing very poor indeed and looking half starved and ill clad and attired in a variety of clothes ranging from boiler suits to old and ragged pieces of uniform and even blankets and other odd pieces of clothing. There were also some people, both women and men, who appeared very well to do and whom I assumed to be the wives and relatives of officials. A few of the refugees appeared to have all their worldly possessions with them carried in suitcases; bags of all descriptions, some tied up in large handkerchiefs and a few with suitcases."

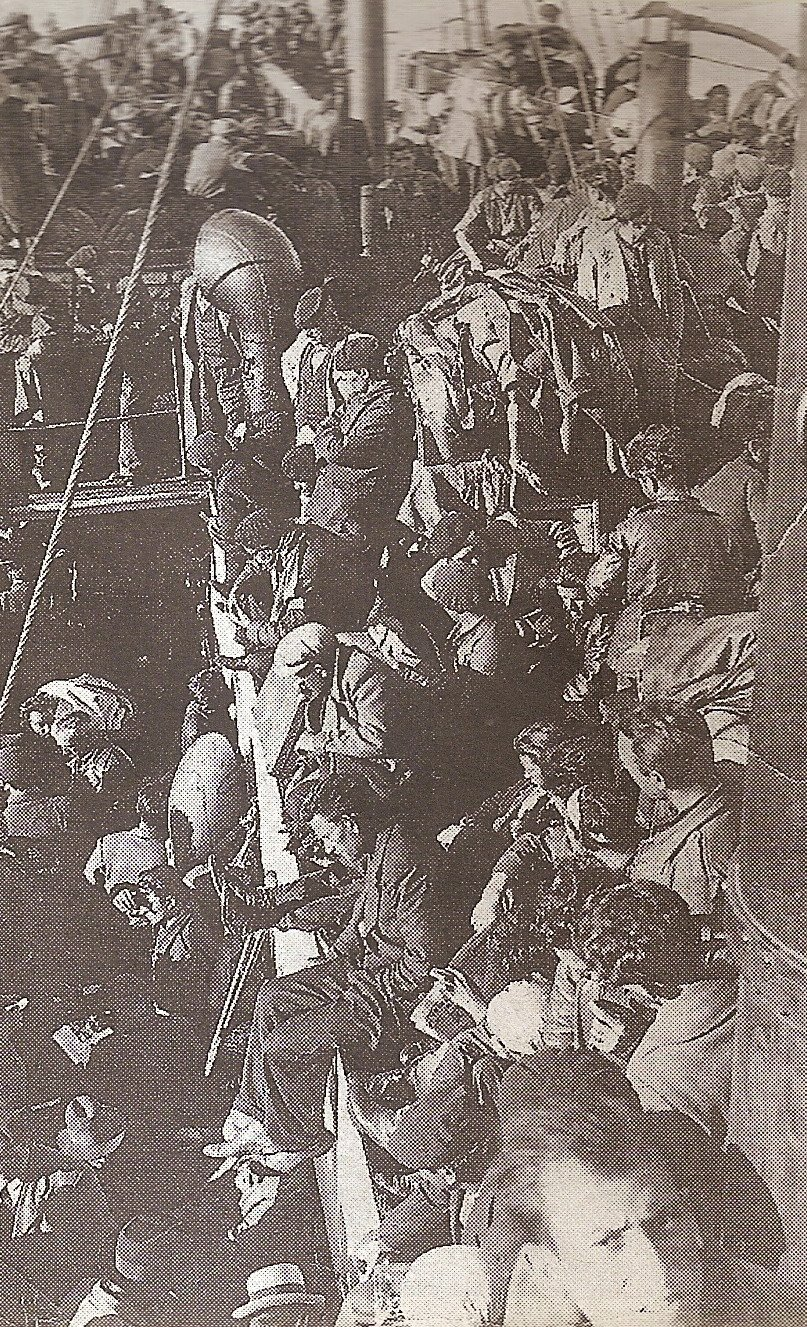
Republican refugees crowding Stanbrook's decks in Oran in 1939

Stanbrook left Alicante at sunset on 28 March with 2,638 people aboard, leaving no-one on the quay, as Dickson promised. She was significantly overloaded, and listed below her load line as she sailed.

The Nationalist cruiser Spanish cruiser Canarias was blockading the port and opened fire, but Stanbrook managed to avoid being hit. Dickson at first set course toward the Balearic Islands, but the Nationalist navy continued to intimidate Stanbrook, forcing her toward a Nationalist-held Spanish port. Dickson tried to escape overnight, while his wireless telegraphist radioed for help. At last a Royal Navy cruiser intervened and saved Stanbrook, allowing her to change course to the south to Oran in Algeria.

Helia González recalled the journey:

"I remember a crowded deck, with the dark sky above our heads. It was raining that night, not much, but it was cold. Dad told me to look after my little sister. Mum shared a Spanish omelette, made from one egg, two potatoes and a bit of fat, with a family from Malaga: a married couple with a son the same age as me."

=== Refugees in Algeria ===
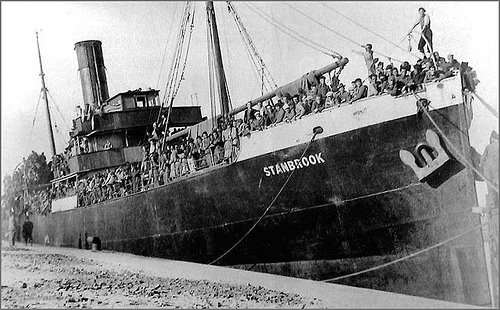
Republican refugees lining Stanbrook's decks in Oran in 1939

After a 22-hour journey, during which Dickson, according to his own recollection, gave “a little coffee and food to the weakest of the refugees”, Stanbrook reached Mers El Kébir, near Oran. Spanish residents in Oran brought them food and medicine in small boats. Two days later, thanks to Dickson's efforts, the French authorities allowed women, children, the injured and the infirm to disembark, who were taken into the former prison of Cardinal Cisneros. Helia González recalled:

“They took us to a place where we could shower and disinfect ourselves; it was not a pleasant memory, it was dark, damp and cold, and there were some men watching us, even the naked women,”

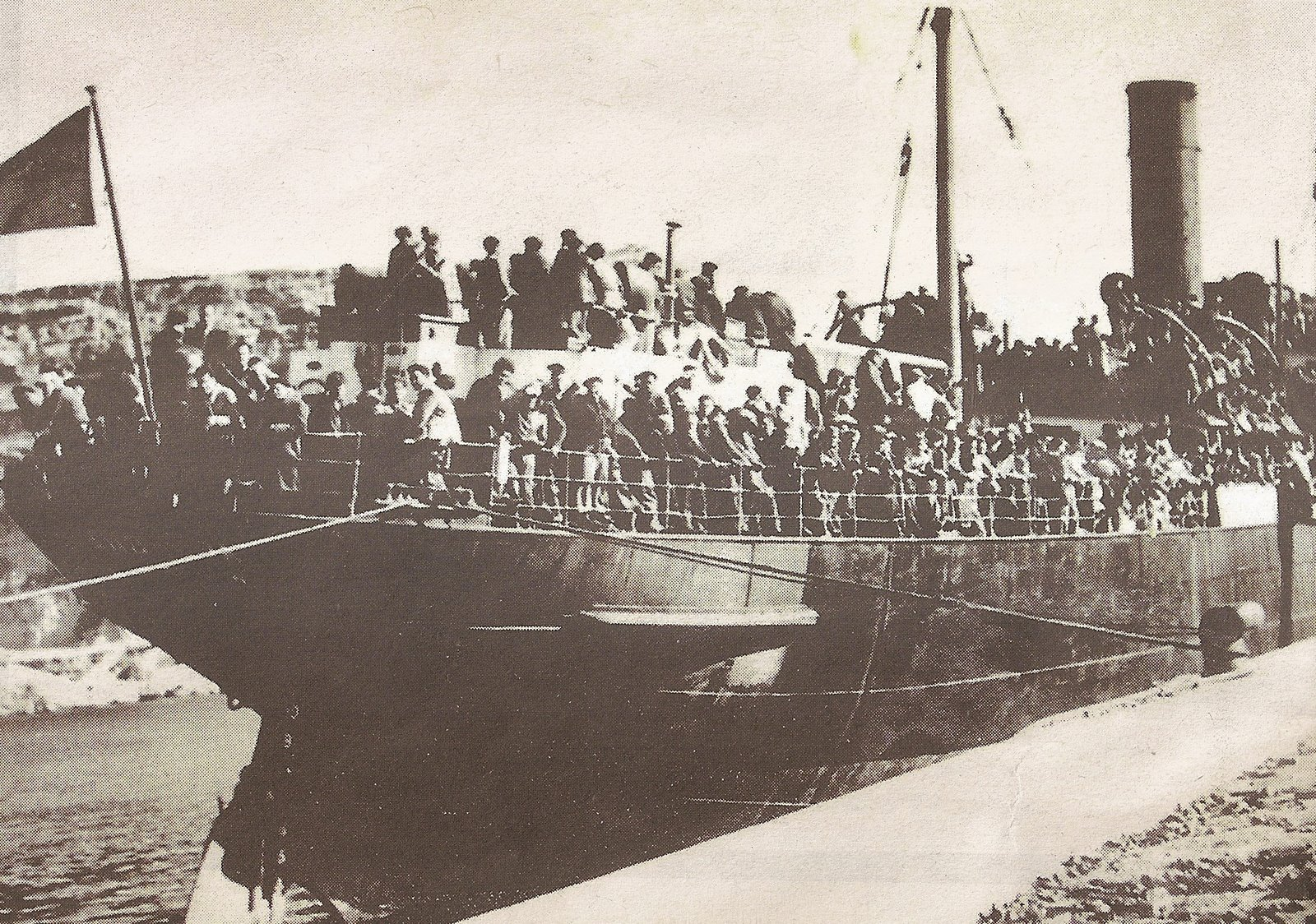
Republican refugees crowding Stanbrook's stern in Oran in 1939

French authorities did not allow the 1,500 or so men aboard to disambark for another month, as the Nationalists demanded their return. After several rounds of negotiation, a change of public opinion in France, and intervention from the international community, who had begun to become aware of the terrible repression and extermination that the Republican prisoners were suffering at the hands of the winning side, France's agreement to return the passengers to Francoist Spain was eventually thwarted. This enabled the ship to dock in Oran, and for her remaining refugees to claim asylum. Antonio Vilanova recalled: “We disembarked covered in vermin. It was there that I saw trimotores for the first time – lice of a monstrous size.” They were directed to an accommodation centre where they were showered, vaccinated and given food provided by Quakers. As they disembarked from the boat, they were searched, for fear that they had firearms in their possession.

Most of Stanbrook refugees were taken to Camp Morand concentration camp in Ksar Boukhari in inland Sahara, guarded by Senegalese riflemen, where they were treated badly. One of the refugees, who was able to flee to France with his brother and later to Mexico, wrote in his diary:

"A Spaniard who is in the latrine is abused by a guard who hits him with his rifle for no reason. Others come and kick him around. The poor man asks for help. Various Spaniards arrive who are met with bayonets and forced to flee. There he remained.”

One of the punishments subjected by guards was el tombeau, where a prisoner would dig his own grave and lie down in it. They were only allowed to leave twice a day to relieve themselves. “You don’t shoot much, but you kill slowly!”, wrote another refugee, a Republican fighter pilot.

Helia González remembered:

“The Spanish were not freed from the labour camps, where they were treated like free labour for constructing the Trans-Saharan Railway, until almost the end of the war; nobody was interested, not the French, nor the allies, in setting those unwanted Spaniards free.”

=== Loss and commemoration ===
On 18 November 1939 Stanbrook left Antwerp in Belgium in ballast for Blyth in North East England. At 02:13 hrs on 19 November U-57 fired one torpedo at Stanbrook at close range. The explosion broke the ship in two, quickly sinking her at position 51°51′N 02°25′E, west-northwest of the North Hinder lightship. Captain Dickson and all 20 of his crew were killed.

When news of Stanbrook's loss and Dickson's death reached the concentration camps in Algeria, Republican refugees there observed a minute's silence in his memory. A street in Alicante is now named after Stanbrook.

In March 2014, professor and composer Miguel Brotóns composed a symphonic poem called Stanbrook. This was one of the activities organised during the 2nd International Conference presented by the University of Valencia’s Faculty of Language Studies, Translation and Communication, on the occasion of the 75th anniversary of the end of the Spanish Civil War in Alicante and the loss of democracy in Spain. The composition Elegía, part of the symphonic poem Stanbrook, was performed for the first time by members of the sextet of the University of Alicante Philharmonic Orchestra.

The Generalitat Valenciana, by the law 14/2017 of 10 November for Democratic Heritage, made 28 March a day of remembrance and homage for victims of the civil war and the dictatorship, commemorating Stanbrook's departure from Alicante in 1939.

== See also ==
- SS Stanwood, another of Jack Billmeir's ships involved with the Spanish Civil War

== Bibliography ==
- Heaton, Paul M (1989). Jack Billmeir Merchant Shipowner. Risca: The Starling Press. ISBN 0-9507714-9-X.
- Heaton, Paul M (2006). Spanish Civil War Blockade Runners. Abergavenny: PM Heaton Publishing. ISBN 1-872006-21-3.
- Jiménez Margalejo, Carlos (2008). Memorias de un refugiado español en el norte de África, 1939-1956 (in Spanish). Madrid: Cinca. ISBN 978-8496889286.
- Lloyd's Register of British and Foreign Shipping. Vol. I.–Steamers. London: Lloyd's Register of Shipping. 1910 – via Internet Archive.
- Lloyd's Register of Shipping (PDF). Vol. II.–Steamers and Motorships of 300 tons gross and over. London: Lloyd's Register of Shipping. 1930 – via Southampton City Council.
- Lloyd's Register of Shipping (PDF). Vol. II.–Steamers and Motorships of 300 tons gross and over. London: Lloyd's Register of Shipping. 1934 – via Southampton City Council.
- Lloyd's Register of Shipping. Vol. II.–Steamers and Motorships of 300 tons gross and over. London: Lloyd's Register of Shipping. 1937 – via Southampton City Council.
- Lloyd's Register of Shipping (PDF). Vol. II.–Steamers and Motorships of 300 tons gross and over. London: Lloyd's Register of Shipping. 1938 – via Southampton City Council.
- Martínez Leal, Juan (2005). "El Stanbrook. Un Barco Mítico en la Memoria de los Exiliados Españoles" (PDF). Pasado y Memoria. Revista de Historia Contemporánea (in Spanish) (4): 65–81. doi:10.14198/PASADO2005.4.05.
- Mercantile Navy List. London. 1910 – via Crew List Index Project.
- Mercantile Navy List. London. 1934 – via Crew List Index Project.
