= Hesione (disambiguation) =

Hesione, in Greek mythology, is the daughter of Laomedon, and the sister of Priam, rescued from a sea-monster by the hero Heracles.

Hesione may also refer to:

- Other figures in Greek mythology:
  - Hesione (Oceanid), in Greek mythology, a daughter of the Titan Oceanus
  - Hesione, one of the names given for the wife of Nauplius, according to Cercops, as cited by the mythographer Apollodorus (2.1.5).
  - Hesione, daughter of Celeus and one of the sacrificial victims of Minotaur
- Hésione, an opera by the French composer André Campra
- SS Hesione, the name of several steamships
- Hesione, a character in George Bernard Shaw's Heartbreak House
