= Archibald Dickson (sea captain) =

Welsh sea captain

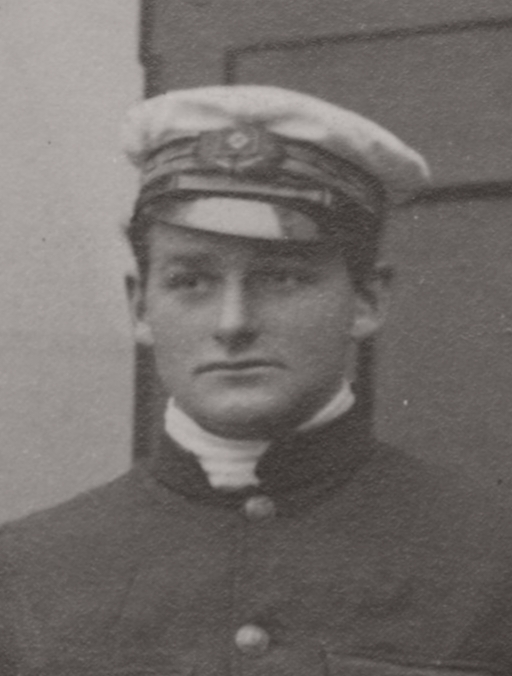
- Born: 1892; Cardiff
- Died: 1939 (aged 46–47); North Sea
- Occupation: Sea captain

Archibald Dickson was a British sea captain who was born in Cardiff, Wales, in 1892, and was killed in the North Sea in 1939. He was a hero of the Spanish Civil War, and served in World War II.

== Maritime career ==
Dickson was the Master of Stanbrook, a British cargo ship that rescued almost 3,000 Spanish Republicans in the port of Alicante, in Spain, during the night of 28 March 1939.

On 18 November 1939, early in World War II, U-57 sank Stanbrook by torpedo in the North Sea. The cargo ship sank with all hands, including Captain Dickson.

== Memory ==
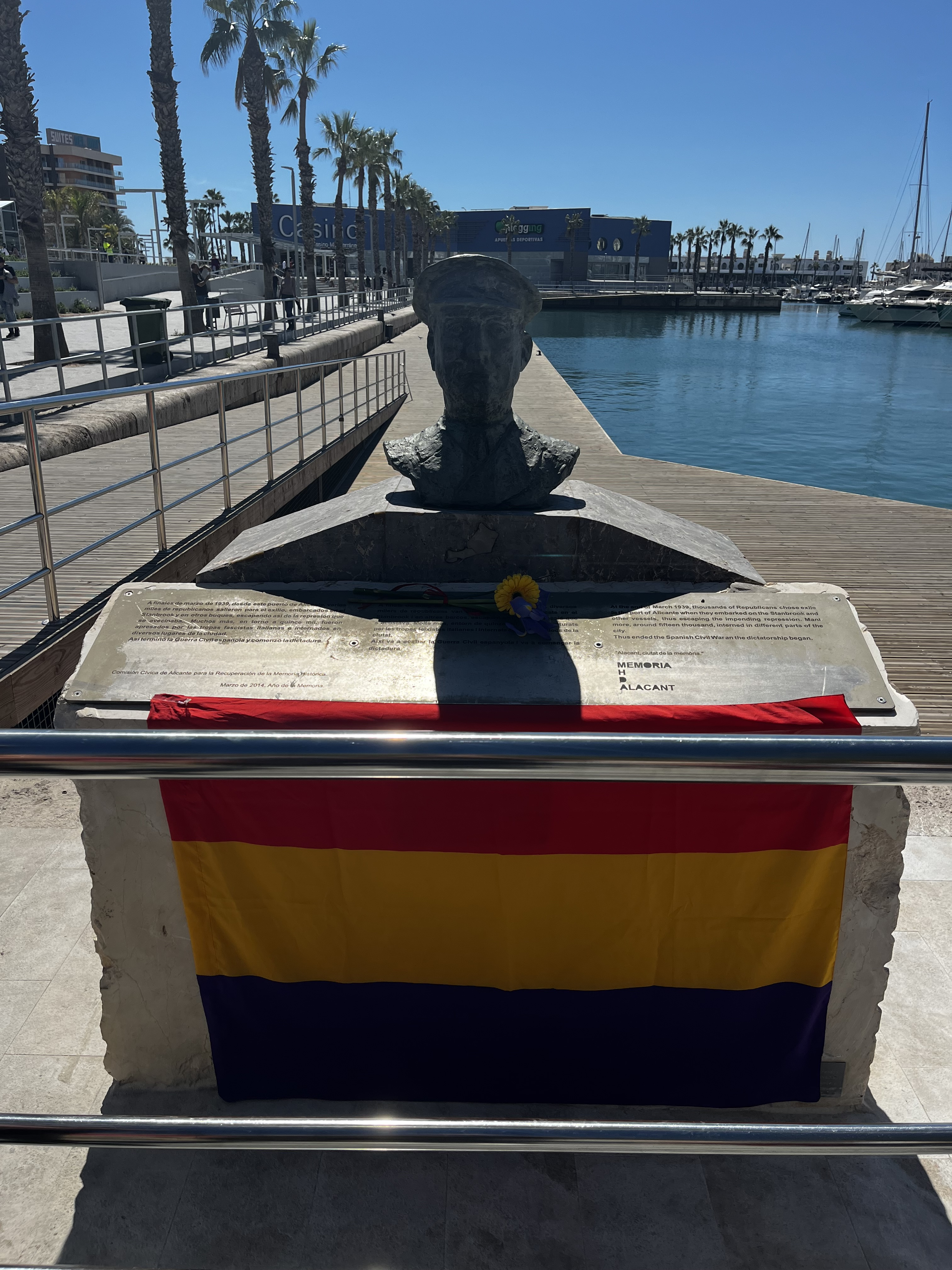
Monument to Captain Dickson in Alicante.

His memory is celebrated by the cities of Cardiff and Alicante, in Spain, and by the Tower Hill Memorial in London.
