= SS Stanwood =

Cargo steamship wreck and recreational dive site

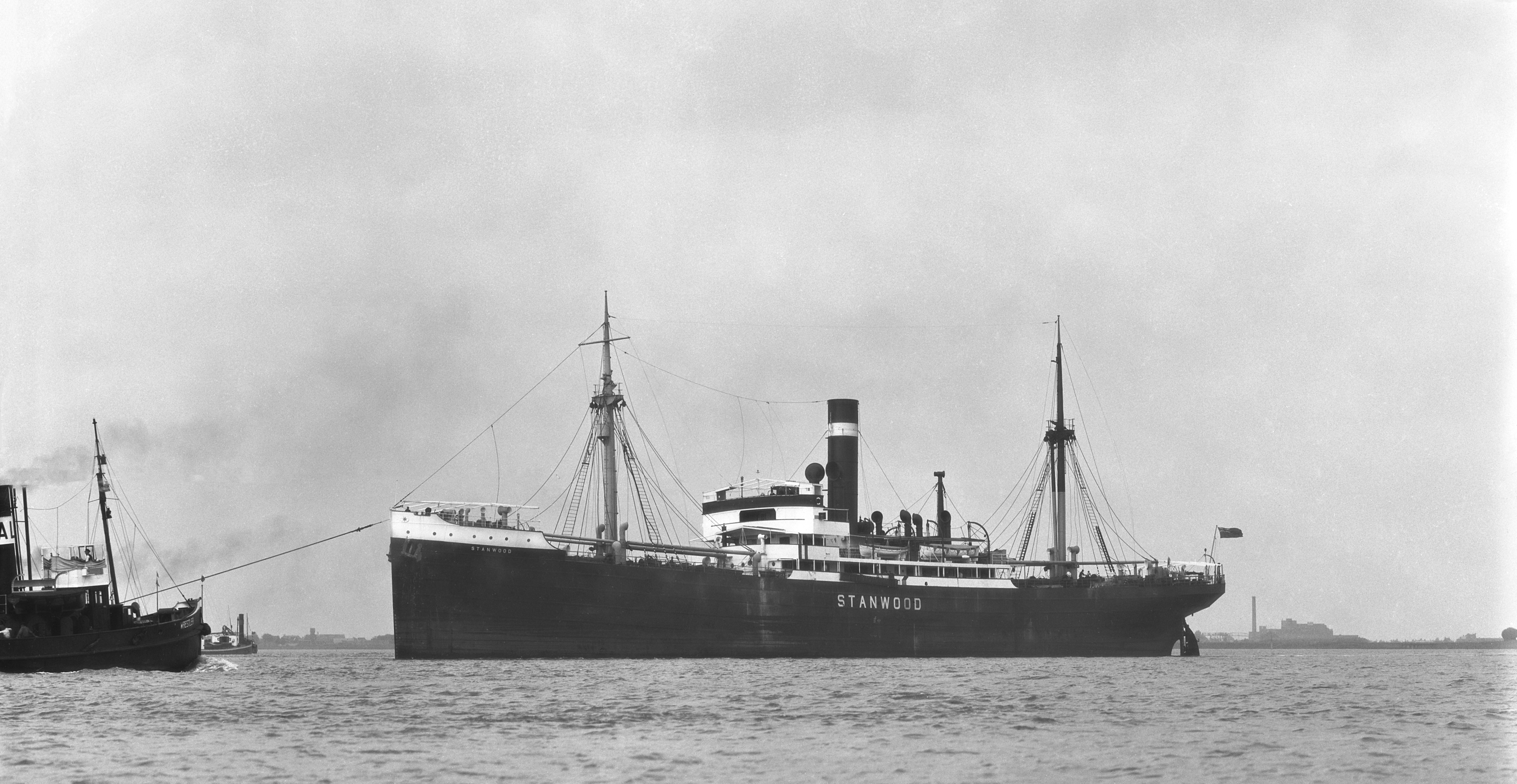
- Stanwood, probably in the Scheldt

History
- Name: 1915: Itajahy; 1921: Hesione; 1937: Stanwood
- Namesake: 1915: Itajaí; 1921: Hesione
- Owner: 1915: (German Empire) Kaiserliche Marine; 1919: Shipping Controller; 1921: Brit & S American SN Co; 1937: Stanhope SS Co
- Operator: 1919: Elder, Dempster & Co Ltd; 1921: RP Houston & Co; 1932: Houston Line (London) Ltd; 1937: JA Billmeir & Co
- Port of registry: 1919: (United Kingdom) London; 1921: (United Kingdom) Liverpool; 1937: (United Kingdom) London
- Builder: Reiherstieg S&M, Hamburg
- Yard number: 459
- Launched: 27 March 1915
- Completed: 1915
- Identification: 1919: UK official number 143082; code letters JWLG; by 1930: call sign GBCQ
- Fate: sunk, 10 December 1939

General characteristics
- Type: cargo steamship
- Tonnage: 4,155 GRT, 2,535 NRT
- Length: 110.2 m (361.5 ft) registered
- Beam: 15.6 m (51.2 ft)
- Depth: 7.7 m (25.3 ft)
- Decks: 2
- Installed power: 1 × triple-expansion engine; 1,900 ihp, 410 NHP
- Propulsion: 1 × screw
- Speed: 10 knots (19 km/h)
- Sensors & processing systems: by 1930: wireless direction finding
- Notes: sister ship: Argentina

SS Stanwood was a cargo steamship. She was launched in Germany in 1915 as Itajahy, and the Kaiserliche Marine (Imperial German Navy) requisitioned her as an auxiliary ship. The United Kingdom seized her in 1919 as part of Germany's World War I reparations to the Entente Powers. With changes of ownership, she was renamed Hesione in 1921, and Stanwood in 1937.

The ship survived a cargo fire in 1926, a collision in 1935, and an air attack in 1937 in the Spanish Civil War. In 1939, two months after the Second World War began, she suffered another cargo fire, which led to her sinking. Her remains, on the Channel coast of Cornwall, are now a wreck diving site.

== Building ==
Hamburg Südamerikanische Dampfschifffahrts-Gesellschaft (HSDG) ordered the ship from Reiherstieg Schiffswerfte & Maschinenfabrik in Hamburg, who built her as yard number 459. She was launched on 27 March 1915 as Itajahy, named after the coastal city of Itajaí, which is a major seaport in southern Brazil. Itajahy unusually small for a new HSDG ship at that time: only 110.2 m (361.5 ft) long; 15.6 m (51.2 ft) beam, and 7.7 m (25.3 ft) depth. Her tonnages were 4,155 GRT and 2,535 NRT. She had a single screw, driven by a three-cylinder triple-expansion engine. It was rated at 1,900 ihp or 410 NHP, and gave her a speed of 10 knots (19 km/h). Itajahy never entered HSDG service, as the Kaiserliche Marine requisitioned her as an auxiliary ship.

== Sister ship ==
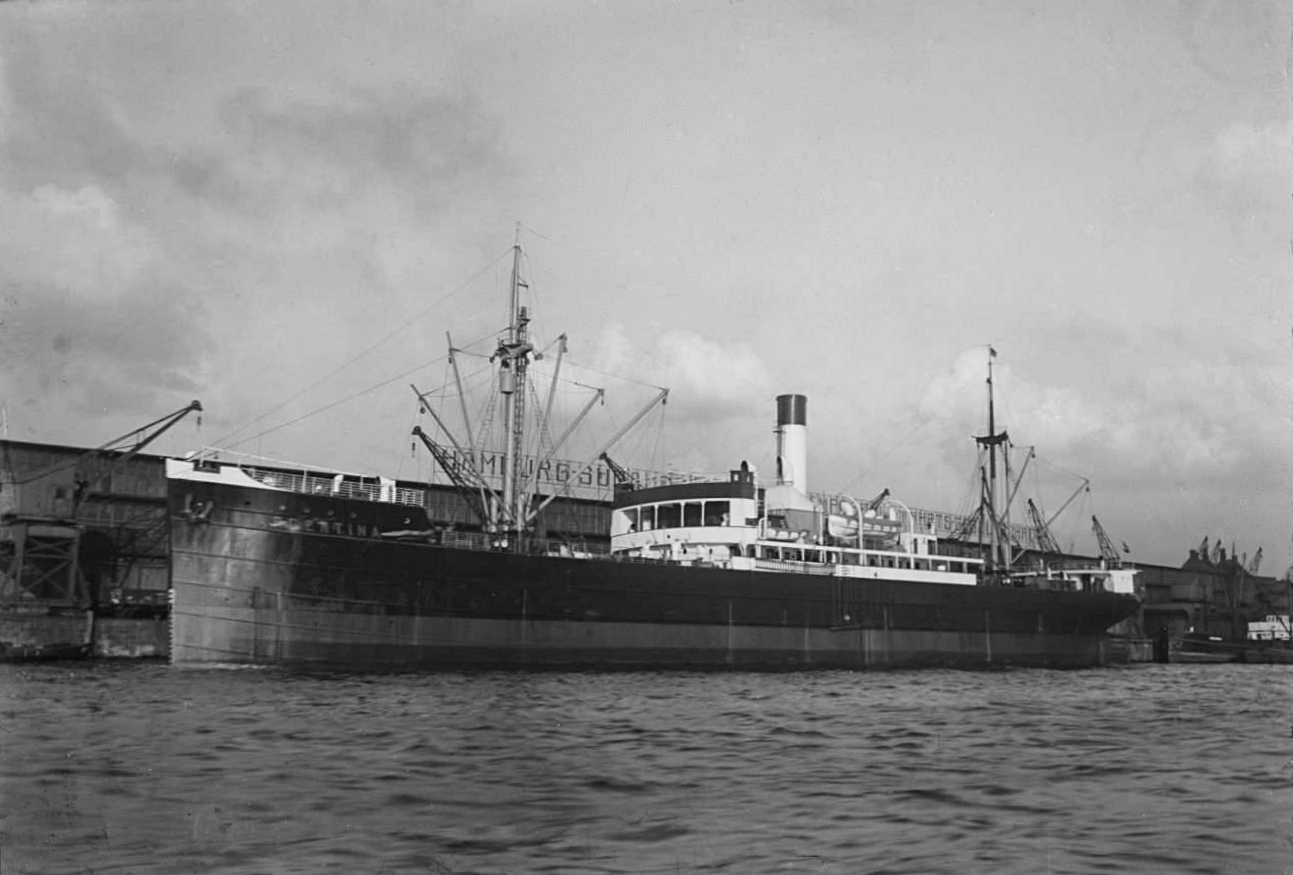
Argentina, probably between 1928 and 1932

HSDG ordered a sister ship for Itajahy from a different shipyard; Georg Seebeck AG in Geestemünde. She was launched in April 1918 as Jacuhy, named after the Jacuí River in southern Brazil. After the Armistice of 11 November 1918, Seebeck deliberately slowed her completion, to prevent the Allies from seizing her. Her design was revised by the addition of berths for 585 steerage passengers, and her name was changed. She entered HSDG service in 1920 as Argentina, and remained in the fleet until she was sold for scrap in 1932.

== UK ownership ==
On 26 March 1919, Itajahy was surrendered to the Allied Shipping Commission. The UK Shipping Controller took ownership of her, and registered her in London. Her official number was 143082, and her code letters were JWLG. The Shipping Controller appointed Elder, Dempster & Co Ltd to manage her.

In 1921 a Liverpool-based shipowner, Robert Houston, bought Itajahy for his British and South American Steam Navigation Company. She was renamed Hesione, which is the name of several women in Greek mythology. She was re-registered in Liverpool. Robert Houston died in 1926, and Hesione's managers were restyled "Houston Line (London) Ltd" in 1932. By 1930, Hesione was equipped with wireless direction finding. Also by 1930, her call sign was GBCQ, and by 1934, this had superseded her code letters.

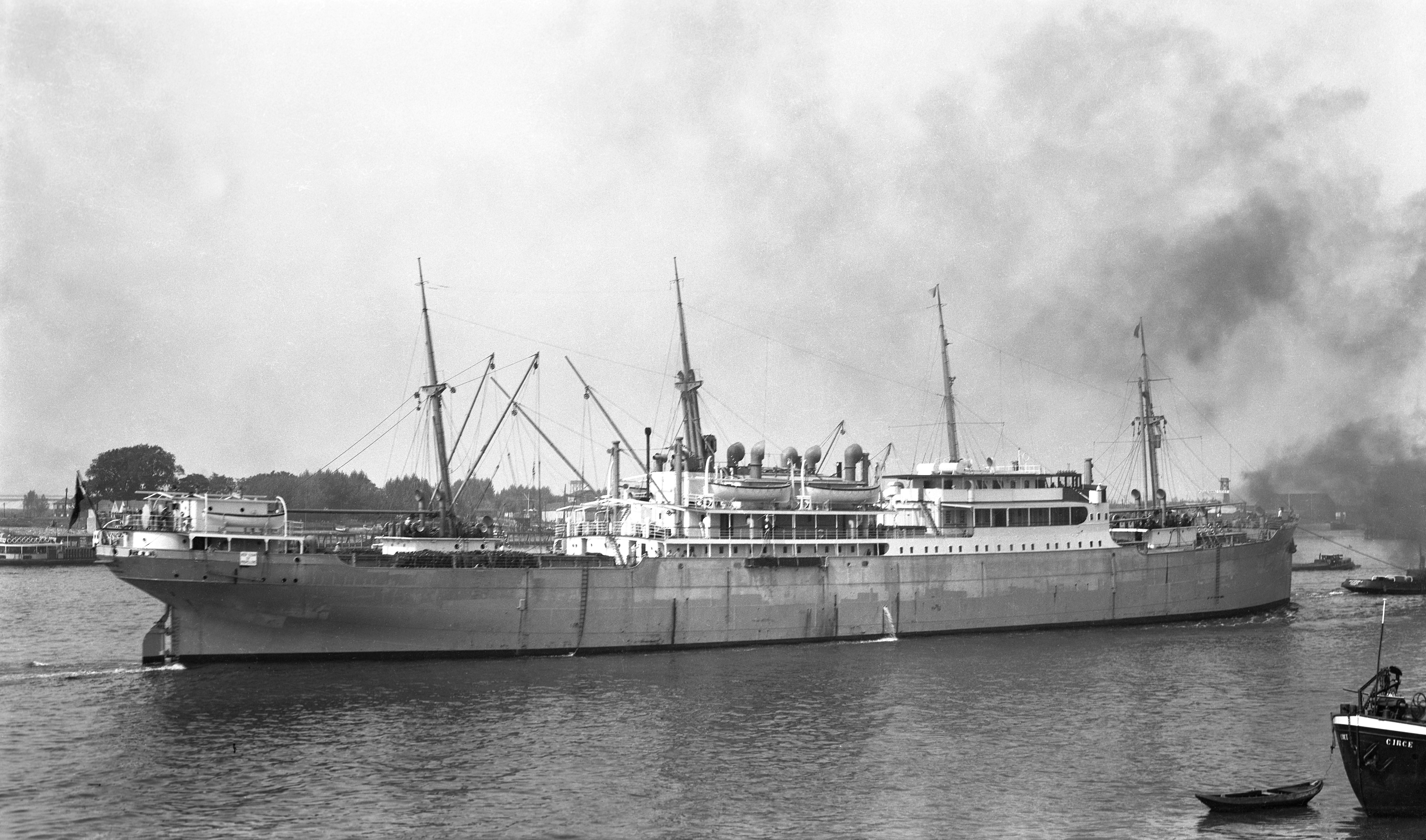
The Danish motor ship Boringia

In 1926, Hesione was about to leave Buenos Aires with a cargo of maize when a smouldering fire was discovered in her cargo. The fire took five days to extinguish. On 27 January 1935, Hesione was berthed in Middlesbrough Dock when an Østasiatiske Kompagni motor ship, Boringia, tried to leave port in a northerly gale. Boringia was blown off-course, and collided with Hesione.

== Spanish Civil War ==
In 1937 a London shipowner, Jack Billmeir, bought Hesione for his Stanhope Steamship Company. He renamed her Stanwood, and registered her in London. Billmeir had founded the Stanhope SS Co in 1934. It had a very small fleet until 1937, when Billmeir added numerous relatively old cargo ships in order to trade with the Second Spanish Republic in the Spanish Civil War. This was blockade running, as the rebel Nationalist navy was blockading Republican ports.

By August 1937, Stanwood was in port in Gijón in Asturias. On 25 August, Nationalist forces seized Santander, only 150 kilometres (93 mi) east of Gijón, and their Italian allies seized Santoña, less than 30 kilometres (19 mi) east of Santander. This isolated Gijón in a Republican pocket on the coast, surrounded by Nationalist forces.

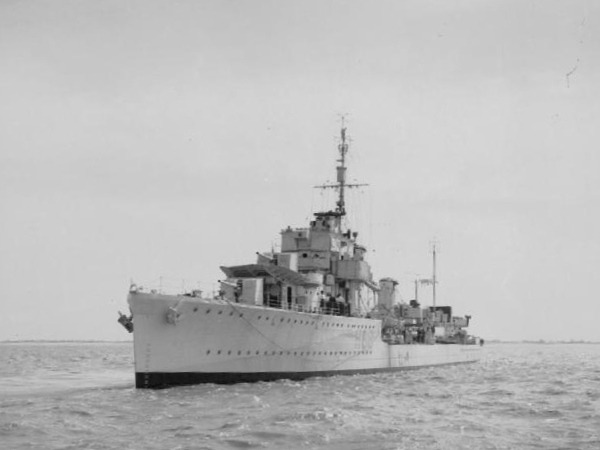
HMS Foresight, which with HMS Fearless escorted African Trader to La Pallice

On 26 or 27 August, Nationalist aircraft attacked ships in Gijón. They damaged four UK-registered ships, including Stanwood and another Billmeir ship, the oil tanker Stanbridge. The two other UK ships damaged in the attack were African Trader and Hilda Moller. African Trader, Hilda Moller, and Stanwood left port as soon as it was safe to do so. African Trader was leaking badly, and her pumps were only just keeping her afloat. The Royal Navy destroyers HMS Fearless and HMS Foresight escorted African Trader to La Pallice, in case she foundered en route. Stanwood also made for La Pallice, where she arrived on 29 August. Stanbridge was too badly damaged to put to sea. She stayed in Gijón for emergency repairs, and to discharge the remainder of her cargo. She remained in port for a fortnight, surviving further Nationalist air attacks, and left on 11 September.

== Loss ==
In 1939, Stanwood was in Oran in Algeria from 1 February until 10 March. She sailed via Falmouth to Gothenburg in Sweden, where she was in port from 31 March until 6 April. She put in to Cardiff for repairs from 12 to 14 April. She was in Gibraltar from 2 to 4 July, and in Middlesbrough from 13 to 27 July. She was in the Firth of Forth off Methil from 29 July. She loaded a cargo of coal in Leith, and on 15 October she left the Firth of Forth for Buenos Aires via Dakar in Senegal. She was in port in London from 23 October until 2 November, and passed Beachy Head in the English Channel on 5 November. The tubes of one of her boilers began leaking, so at Falmouth, where she called for bunkering, she stopped for repairs.

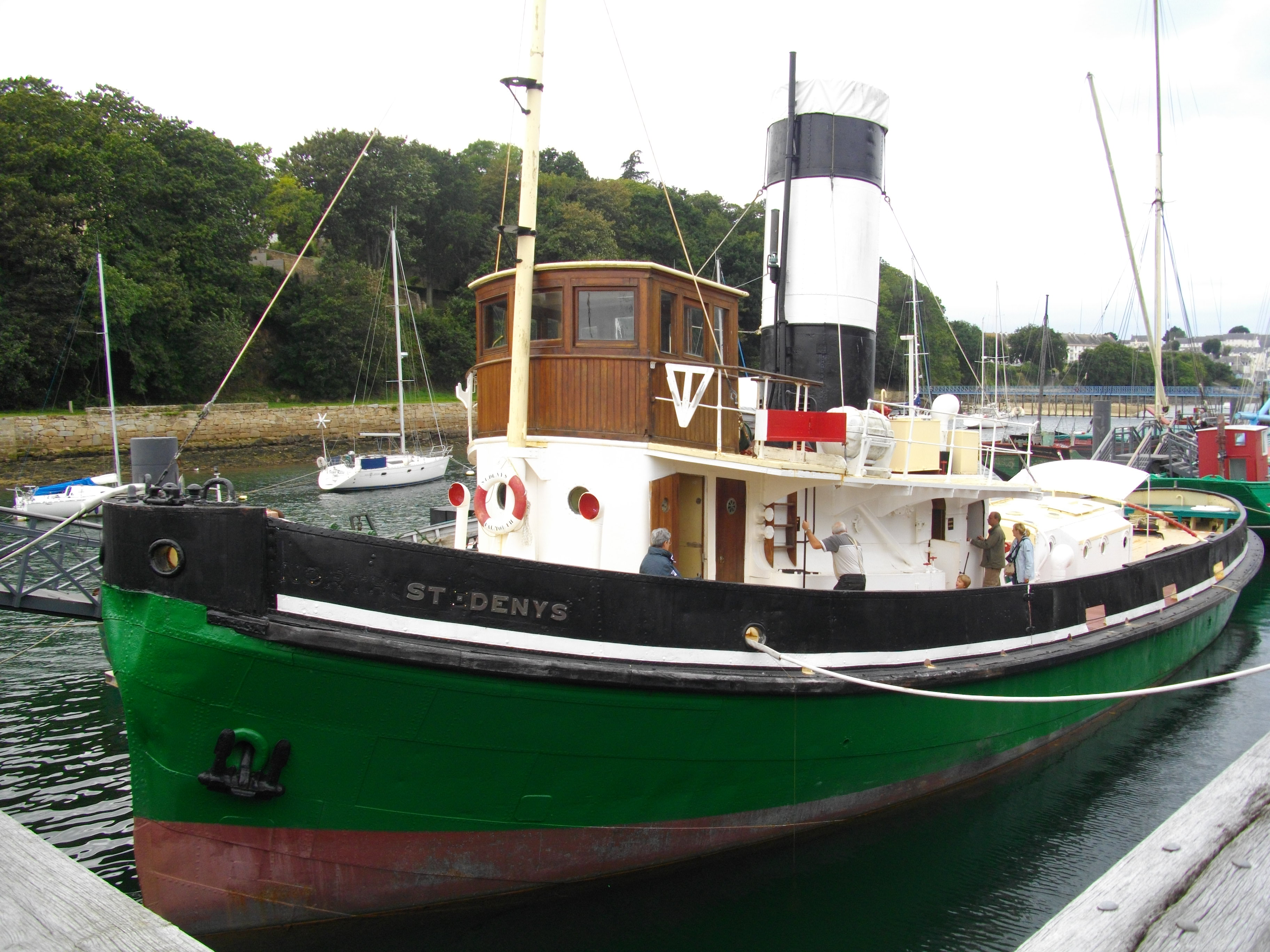
The steam tug Northgate Scot was renamed St. Denys, and is preserved in France

On 10 December, fire broke out in her cargo of coal. Two Falmouth Towage Co steam tugs, Fairnilee and Northgate Scot, towed Stanwood out into Carrick Roads, where controlled flooding in shallow water was used to extinguish the fire. However, as she settled on the seabed, Stanwood capsized and rolled down a bank and sank at 50°10′19″N 5°2′6″W. Her wireless telegraph officer was alseep in his bunk, and was trapped and drowned. The two tugs had to cut their towing lines, to avoid being dragged down with her.

== Wreck ==
Much of Stanwood's coal was salvaged. In November 1946, five surface-supplied divers worked on the wreck. Her wreck was then dispersed with explosives, as it was a hazard to navigation. What remains of her lies scattered on an underwater slope, at a depth of 15 to 26 metres (49 to 85 ft). Fauna include schools of fish; plus congers, lobsters, scallops, and plumose anemones. The wreck is popular with recreational divers. No-one may dive on the wreck without the permission of the harbour master.

== See also ==
- SS Stanbrook, another of Jack Billmeir's ships involved with the Spanish Civil War
- List of shipwrecks of Cornwall

== Bibliography ==
- Cooper, James; Kludas, Arnold; Pein, Joachim (1989). The Hamburg South America Line. Kendal: World Ship Society. ISBN 0-905617-50-9.
- Haws, Duncan (1997). Clan, Houston, Turnbull Martin & Scottish Tankers. Merchant Fleets. Vol. 33. Pembroke: TCL Publications. ISBN 978-0946378333.
- Heaton, Paul M (1989). Jack Billmeir Merchant Shipowner. Risca: The Starling Press. ISBN 0-9507714-9-X.
- Heaton, Paul M (2006). Spanish Civil War Blockade Runners. Abergavenny: PM Heaton Publishing. ISBN 1-872006-21-3.
- Lloyd's Register of Shipping. Vol. II.–Steamers. London: Lloyd's Register of Shipping. 1919 – via Internet Archive.
- Lloyd's Register of Shipping. Vol. II.–Steamers. London: Lloyd's Register of Shipping. 1921 – via Internet Archive.
- Lloyd's Register of Shipping (PDF). Vol. II.–Steamers and Motorships of 300 Tons Gross and Over. London: Lloyd's Register of Shipping. 1930 – via Southampton City Council.
- Lloyd's Register of Shipping (PDF). Vol. II.–Steamers and Motorships of 300 Tons Gross and Over. London: Lloyd's Register of Shipping. 1931 – via Southampton City Council.
- Lloyd's Register of Shipping (PDF). Vol. II.–Steamers and Motorships of 300 Tons Gross and Over. London: Lloyd's Register of Shipping. 1934 – via Southampton City Council.
- Lloyd's Register of Shipping (PDF). Vol. II.–Steamers and Motorships of 300 Tons Gross and Over. London: Lloyd's Register of Shipping. 1937 – via Southampton City Council.
- Mercantile Navy List. London: The Registrar General of Shipping and Seamen. 1920 – via Crew List Index Project.
- Mercantile Navy List. London: The Registrar General of Shipping and Seamen. 1922 – via Crew List Index Project.
- Mercantile Navy List. London: The Registrar General of Shipping and Seamen. 1930 – via Crew List Index Project.
- Mercantile Navy List. London: The Registrar General of Shipping and Seamen. 1938 – via Crew List Index Project.
- Register Book. Vol. I: Register of Ships. London: Lloyd's Register of Shipping. 1959 – via Internet Archive.
