= SS Manchester Merchant =

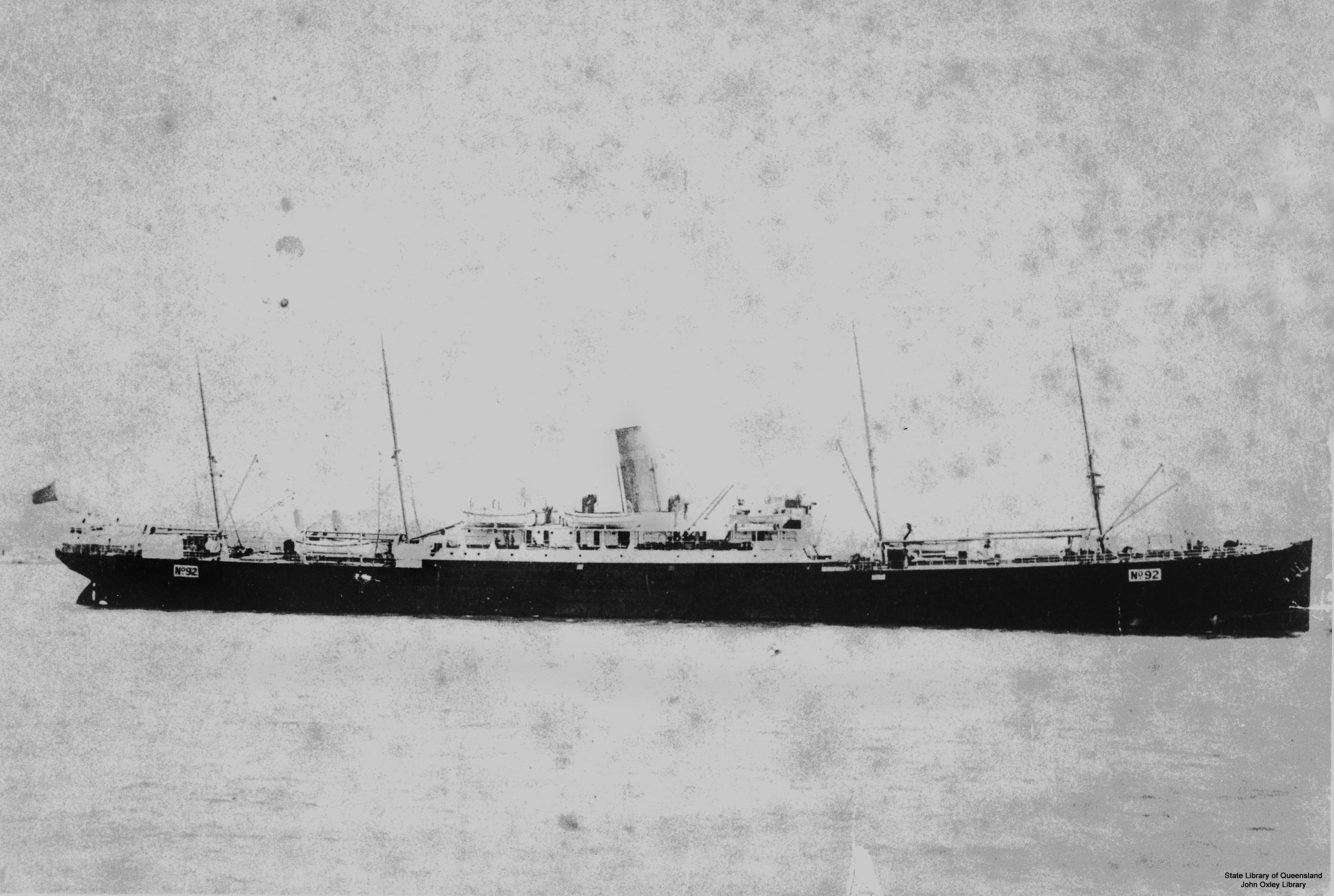

SS Manchester Merchant was a 452-foot (138 m) long and 5,657-ton cargo liner built by Palmers & Co. of Jarrow and owned by Manchester Liners. She served as transport No 92 during the Boer War and on the New Orleans to Manchester run and was lost off Dingle bay on 15 January 1903 due to the cargo of bales of cotton, barrels of turpentine, soap, and pitch pine catching fire as she approach Ireland. The wreck, which is relatively intact, is a notable one for divers to visit.

There were three other ships to bear the same name. The second ship was built in 1904 and broken up in 1933. The third built in 1940 by Blythswood Shipbuilding Co Ltd, Glasgow was lost on 25 Feb 1943 to an attack by U-628, and the forth built in 1951 was abandoned and sunk in 1972.
