= SS Hesione =

Hesione is the name of several women in Greek mythology. It has been given to several steamships:

- SS Hesione (1899), sunk by a U-boat in 1915
- SS Hesione (1915), sold and renamed SS Stanwood in 1937
- SS Hesione (1920), completed as Harmonides, sunk by torpedo by a Japanese submarine in 1942
- SS Hesione (1943), scrapped in 1960
