= Port of Oran =

Coordinates: 35°42′30″N 0°38′20″W

Port of Oran ميناء وهران
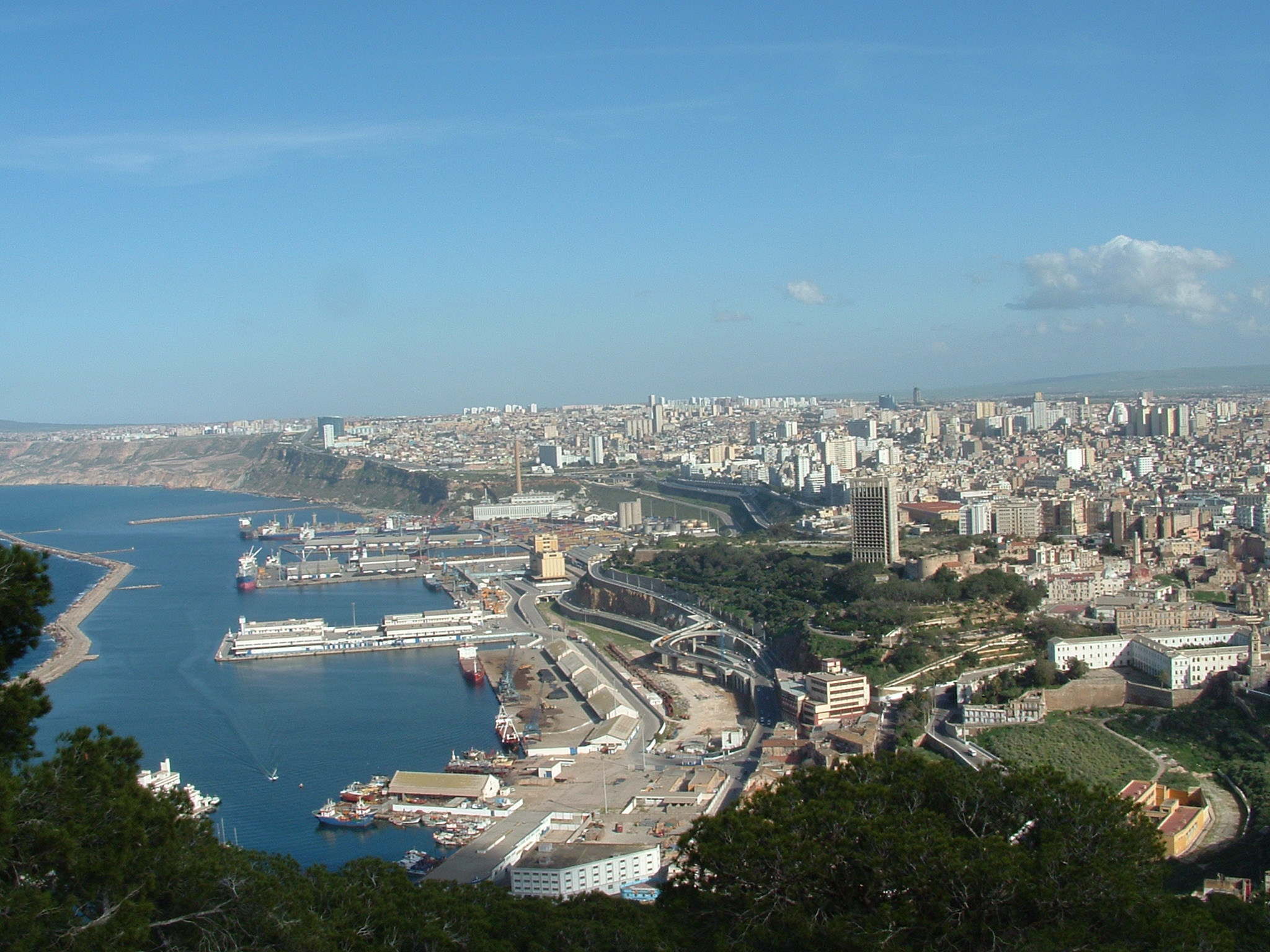
- Overview of the port
- Click on the map for a fullscreen view

Location
- Country: Algeria
- Location: Wahran

Details
- UN/LOCODE: DZORN
- Depth: Channel 31 - 35 feet (9.4 - 10 meters), Cargo Pier 11 - 15 feet (3.4 - 4.6 meters)
- Anchorage: 36 - 40 feet 11 - 12.2 meters

The Port of Oran (Arabic: ميناء وهران) is an Algerian port in the west of the country and exactly in the city of Oran, overlooking the Mediterranean Sea and is considered one of the important ports in each of the fields of trade and marine transportation.
