= Port of Manchester =

Port in the United Kingdom

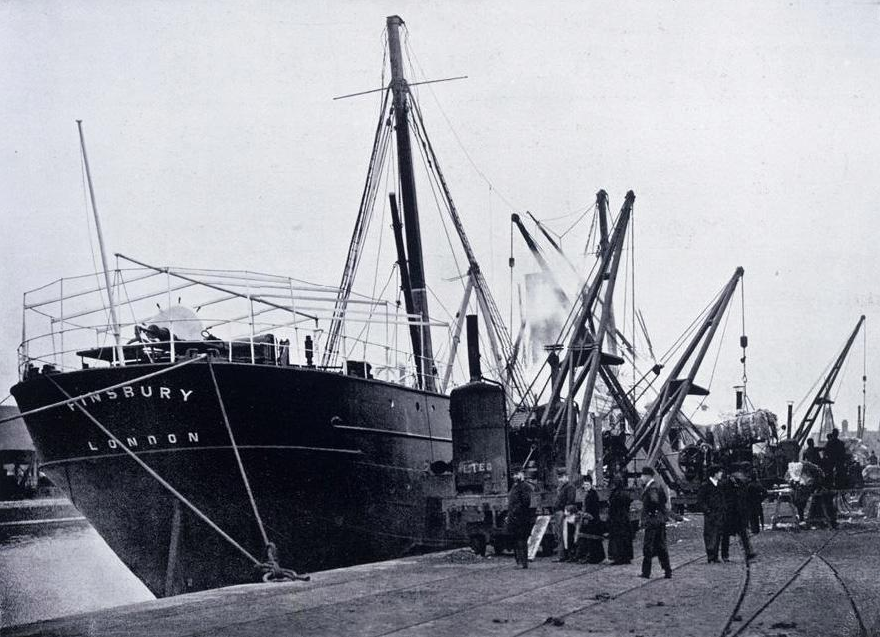
- The first cotton to arrive at the Port of Manchester being unloaded on 17 January 1894
- Interactive map of Port of Manchester
- Location in Greater Manchester

Location
- Location: England
- Coordinates: 53°29′N 2°16′W

The Port of Manchester was a port in Salford, North West England, until its closure in 1982. It was created as a customs port on 1 January 1894, four months before the official opening of the Manchester Ship Canal. It extended along the whole 36-mile (58 km) length of the ship canal, from Eastham in the west to Manchester in the east, absorbing the Port of Runcorn, which had been created in 1862. The new port was only 3.74 miles (6.02 km) from the Port of Liverpool's boundary at Herculaneum Dock, and 2.4 miles (3.9 km) from the Port of Garston. The ship canal transformed Manchester from a landlocked city into a major sea port, at its height the third-busiest port in the United Kingdom. Once delivered to the port, goods could be transported to other parts of the country such as Leeds to the east, and up to 100 miles (160 km) south as far as Birmingham.

== History ==
Manchester Ship Canal

On 1 January 1894, a steamer owned by the Cooperative Wholesale Society, the Pioneer, unloaded its cargo of sugar from Rouen, claiming the honour of being the first merchant vessel to be registered in the Port of Manchester. Initially, the port struggled to compete with the more established ports, partly because of the inertia of the influential shipping conferences (cartels). In 1908, although Manchester had about 75 per cent of the mule spindles in the United Kingdom, only 14 per cent of the raw material used in cotton spinning passed through the Port of Manchester. Despite the competition, trade grew steadily. Between 1895 and 1896, 121,336 bales of cotton were imported from America, the main source of cotton; this increased to 377,264 bales in 1907–1908.

=== 20th century ===
The Port of Manchester was not the major destination for American cotton in the early 20th century, but it was for Egyptian cotton. In 1907–1908 about half of the cotton used in Lancashire cotton mills passed through the port, about 216,570 bales. In the early-20th century, the main produce travelling through the port was timber, grain, and cotton. The grain trade expanded more than tenfold, increasing from 35,000 long tons (35,562 t) in 1895 to 406,000 long tons (412,515 t) in 1907.

Based on value of import and export trade, between 1904 and 1964 the Port of Manchester was in the top five most important custom ports in the UK for 39 out of the 55 years for which figures exist. The peak year for tonnage was 1959, but the port declined in the 1960s because of the increasing size of ocean-going vessels, most of which could not enter the canal.

== Manchester Liners ==
Manchester Liners was established on 3 May 1898, to provide a fortnightly transatlantic service between the Port of Manchester and North America, via the Manchester Ship Canal. Its first purpose-built ship, Manchester City, launched on 27 October 1898, was designed to suit the dimensions of the canal, and was fitted with telescopic masts to allow it to pass under the bridges along the canal. The success of its inaugural trip to Halifax, Nova Scotia, encouraged Manchester Liners to order seven more ships to the same design. The company continued to operate vessels registered in Manchester for more than 80 years, until 1985.
