= Díaz =

- Pronunciation: Spanish: [ˈdiaθ], in Latin America: [ˈdias]

Origin
- Meaning: "Son of Diego"
- Region of origin: Kingdom of Castile, in Spain

Other names
- Variant forms: Diaz (anglicized), Dias (Portuguese variant)

Díaz is a common surname of Spanish origin with multiple meanings in multiple languages. First found in the Kingdom of Castile, where the name originated in the Visigoth period, the name accounts for about 0.17% of the Spanish population, ranking as the 14th-most frequently found surname in both 1999 and 2004.

== Variants and related names ==
There is minor evidence that Díez may be equivalent to Díaz, in the form of Spanish language listing of most frequent surnames in 1999 Spain. However, a 2008 in-press academic manuscript about Spanish naming in 2004 suggests otherwise, listing statistics for "Díaz" and "Díez" separately. The surname is a cognate with the Portuguese language surname Dias.

== Usage ==
Díaz and the anglicized form Diaz appear to be surnames only, without evidence for use as given names. Use of Diaz may arise through Anglicization of Portuguese language Dias.

Many examples of the surnames Díaz exist among historically notable people as a patronymic of Diego. Among the earliest such examples is El Cid, whose real name was Rodrigo Díaz de Vivar, and whose father's given name was Diego.

== Geographical distribution ==
As of 2014, 21.5% of all known bearers of the surname Díaz were residents of Mexico (frequency 1:132), 11.4% of Colombia (1:96), 9.1% of Argentina (1:108), 8.0% of Spain (1:134), 7.2% of Venezuela (1:96), 6.7% of the United States (1:1,242), 5.2% of Peru (1:142), 5.0% of Cuba (1:53), 4.6% of Chile (1:87), 3.1% of the Philippines (1:742), 2.9% of the Dominican Republic (1:83), 2.5% of Puerto Rico (1:33), 2.4% of Guatemala (1:155), 2.0% of Honduras (1:100), 1.4% of El Salvador (1:107), 1.3% of Nicaragua (1:103), 1.2% of Ecuador (1:293) and 1.0% of Paraguay (1:161).

In Spain, the frequency of the surname was higher than the national average (1:134) in the following autonomous communities:

1. Canary Islands (1:53)
2. Asturias (1:54)
3. Extremadura (1:85)
4. Cantabria (1:89)
5. Castilla-La Mancha (1:97)
6. Galicia (1:112)
7. Andalusia (1:114)
8. Community of Madrid (1:121)

In Puerto Rico, the frequency of the surname was higher than the national average (1:33) in the following municipalities:

1. Manatí (1:14)
2. Peñuelas (1:16)
3. Arecibo (1:16)
4. Morovis (1:16)
5. Yauco (1:17)
6. Barceloneta (1:17)
7. Guayanilla (1:17)
8. Florida (1:17)
9. Ponce (1:19)
10. Hatillo (1:19)
11. Isabela (1:19)
12. Utuado (1:20)
13. Cabo Rojo (1:20)
14. Ciales (1:21)
15. Lares (1:21)
16. Naranjito (1:21)
17. Camuy (1:22)
18. Quebradillas (1:22)
19. Rincón (1:22)
20. Canóvanas (1:22)
21. Aguadilla (1:23)
22. San Juan (1:23)
23. Loíza (1:24)
24. Juana Díaz (1:25)
25. Río Grande (1:25)
26. Trujillo Alto (1:28)

The following matrix contains available information on the frequency of this surname in various countries across a span of years.

Country	1880–1889	1960–1969	1990–1999	2000–2009
Australia				2002: 0.008% (rank ?)(c)
New Zealand				2002: 0.002% (rank ?)(c)
Spain			1999: 0.74% (rank 14)(a)	2004: na% (rank 14)(b)
United Kingdom	1881: na% (rank 23,037)(c)		1998: 0.001% (rank 10,773)(c)	
United States		1964: 0.047% (rank 335)	1990: 0.084% (rank 99)(d); 1990: 0.014% (rank ?)(c)	2000: 0.18% (rank 73)(d)

Reference codes, see #References: (a)=OcioTotal 1999, (b)=Mateos & Tucker 2008, (c)=Longley, et al., (d)=United States Census Bureau 1995, (e)=United States Census Bureau 2000

== Notable people ==
=== Arts and entertainment ===
- Alirio Díaz (1923–2016), Venezuelan guitarist
- Álvaro Díaz González (born 1972), Chilean screenwriter, producer and director
- Alyssa Diaz (born 1985), American-Colombian actress
- Ámbar Díaz (born 1983), Venezuelan actress
- Ana Diaz (Swedish singer)
- Ana Díaz (Mexican singer) (born 1972)
- Andres Rafael Diaz Rosa (born 1976), Spanish/Norwegian rapper "Diaz"
- Cameron Diaz (born 1972), American actress, producer, and former fashion model
- Carla Diaz, Brazilian actress
- Carla Díaz, Spanish actress and dancer
- Carolina del Castillo Díaz (1867–1933), Spanish painter
- César Díaz (guitarist) (1951–2002), Puerto Rican guitar amplifier technician and guitarist
- Dilia Díaz Cisneros (1925–2017), Venezuelan teacher and poet
- Diomedes Díaz (1957–2013), Colombian singer, singer, songwriter and composer
- Elisa Ruiz Díaz (1964–2021), Paraguayan diplomat
- Francine Diaz (born 2004), Filipina actress and model
- Gloria Diaz (born 1951), Filipina actress, TV host and beauty queen, first Filipina to win Miss Universe
- Gregoria Díaz (1964–2023), Venezuelan journalist.
- Hernan Diaz (born 1973), writer and academic
- Joey Diaz (born 1963), Cuban-American stand-up comedian, actor, podcast host
- Johnny Diaz, American novelist and a journalist
- Joko Diaz, Filipino actor and action star
- Jonny Diaz (born 1984), American contemporary Christian musician
- José Díaz-Balart (born 1960), Cuban-American journalist and TV news anchor
- José Manuel Díaz (1936–2013), Venezuelan actor and comedian in television and film known by the mononym Joselo
- José María Díaz (1813–1888), Spanish romanticist playwright and journalist
- Julio Díaz (disambiguation), several people
- Junot Díaz (born 1986), American writer
- Lav Diaz or Lavrente Indico Diaz (born 1958), Filipino independent filmmaker
- Leandro Díaz (composer) (1928–2013), Colombian composer
- Mariano Díaz Bravo (born 1929), Venezuelan photographer
- Narcisse Virgilio Díaz de la Peña (1807–1876), French painter of the Barbizon school
- Natalie Diaz (born 1978), Mojave American poet
- Paquito Diaz (1937–2011), Filipino actor and director; father of Joko Diaz
- Patrocinio Díaz (1905–1969), Argentine singer and actress
- Priscilla Diaz (MISSPSTAR/P-Star) (born 1994), American rapper, singer and actress
- Rafael Díaz Ycaza (1925–2013), Ecuadorian poet and writer
- Robert Alan Diaz (1975–2015), American rapper better known as "Pumpkinhead"
- Rocsi Diaz (born 1983), Honduran-born, American television personality and model
- Romy Diaz (1941–2005), Filipino actor
- Roxana Díaz (born 1972), Venezuelan television actress
- Simón Díaz (1928–2014), Venezuelan singer and composer
- Sixto Diaz Rodriguez (1942–2023), Mexican-American singer-songwriter
- Ulpiano Díaz (1900–1990), Cuban percussionist
- Waldo Díaz-Balart (1931–2025), Cuban-born painter and sculptor
- Zadi Diaz, American podcaster and video blogger
- Amalia Perez Diaz (1922–2004), Venezuelan actress

=== Politics and military ===
- Alonso Diaz Moreno (1526–1602), Spanish conquistador founder of Valencia, Venezuela
- Antoni Gutiérrez Díaz (1929–2006), Catalan (Spain) physician and politician
- Antonio Diaz (Filipino politician) (1927–2011), politician in the House of Representatives of the Philippines
- Armando Diaz (1861–1928), Italian General and a Marshal of Italy during World War I (1914–1918)
- Domingo Díaz, Venezuelan militar
- Domingo Díaz Arosemena (1875–1949), Panamanian politician, president from 1948 to 1949
- Edwige Diaz (born 1987), French politician
- Elimar Díaz (born 1989), Venezuelan politician
- Fernando Díaz (marino), Venezuelan military
- Héctor A. Díaz, American politician in Connecticut
- Joaquín Díaz de Vivar (1907–2002), Argentine lawyer and politician, also a descendant of El Cid (Rodrigo de Diaz Vivar, 1043–1099)
- José Díaz, (1895–1942), Spanish Communist and trade unionist, involved in the Spanish Civil War. 1936–1939
- José Domingo Díaz (1772–1834), Venezuelan journalist, physician and polítician
- José E. Díaz (1833–1867), Paraguayan general, hero of the Paraguayan War
- María Arcelia Díaz (1896 - 1939), Mexican union organizer
- Mario Díaz-Balart (born 1961), American politician
- Miguel Díaz-Canel (born 1960), Cuban politician, engineer, first secretary of the Communist Party and leader of Cuba since 2021
- Pedro Díaz de Vivar (1740–1820), Royal Spanish soldier and official, also a descendant of El Cid (Rodrigo de Diaz Vivar, 1043–1099)
- Porfirio Díaz (1830–1915), Mexican soldier, politician, dictator who served seven terms as President of Mexico in late 19th and early 20th century, following the Imperial French (by Emperor Napoleon III) intervention in Mexico with Emperor Maximilian, 1863–1866
- Rafael Díaz-Balart (1926–2005), Cuban politician and anti-Castro organizer
- Ramón Díaz (1926–2017), Uruguayan lawyer, economist and journalist, Chairman of the Central Bank
- Rodrigo Díaz de Vivar (c. 1043–1099), better known as El Cid, or Rodrigo, Castilian (Spain ) nobleman and military leader in medieval Spain
- Adam Perez Diaz (1909–2010), the first Hispanic elected to the Phoenix City Council in Arizona and also the first Hispanic to serve as Phoenix's Vice-Mayor
- José Antonio Pérez Diaz (1922–2005), Venezuelan politician

=== Sports ===
- Aledmys Díaz (born 1990), Cuban professional baseball player, who also played for four franchises / teams in the American Major Leagues
- Alexis Díaz (baseball) (born 1996), Puerto Rican professional baseball player, who plays for the Cincinnati Reds of the National League in Major League Baseball in the United States
- Ana Díaz (born 1954), Cuban volleyball player
- Andrés Díaz (Chilean footballer) (born 1995)
- Andrés Díaz (Argentine footballer) (born 1983)
- Andrés Manuel Díaz, Spanish runner (born 1969)
- Antonio Díaz (karateka) (born 1980), Venezuelan karateka
- Baudilio Díaz (1953–1990), Venezuelan professional baseball player, who plays prominent for the Cleveland Indians of the National League in Major League Baseball in the United States
- Brahim Díaz (born 1999), Spanish footballer
- Cata Díaz, Argentine footballer and manager
- David Díaz (boxer), (born 1976)
- David Díaz (basketball) of Venezuela (born 1964)
- Diomar Díaz (born 1990), Venezuelan footballer
- Edwin Díaz (born 1994), Puerto Rican and American professional baseball player, formerly with the Seattle Mariners of the American League in Major League Baseball, currently with the franchise / team of the New York Mets in the National League
- Elías Díaz (born 1990), Venezuelan baseball player
- Érick Díaz (born 2006), Panamanian footballer
- Ernesto Díaz (1952–2002), Colombian footballer
- Hernán Díaz, Argentine footballer (born 1965)
- Hidilyn Diaz (born 1991), Filipina weightlifter and Olympic Champion
- Horacio Díaz Luco (1943–2025), Chilean footballer
- Hugo Díaz, multiple people
- Isidoro Díaz (born 1938), Mexican footballer
- Jhonathan Díaz (born 1996), Venezuelan baseball player
- Joaquin Carlos Diaz (1948–2015), Cuban chess master
- Jordan Díaz (baseball) (born 2000), Colombian baseball player
- Joselo Díaz (born 1980), Dominican and former American professional Major League Baseball player (pitcher) with several franchises / teams plus Minor League Baseball, later with Nippon (Japanese) professional baseball team
- Juan Díaz Sánchez (1948–2013), Spanish footballer known as Juanito
- Lewin Díaz (born 1996), Dominican baseball player
- Linus Diaz (born 1933), Sri Lankan long-distance runner
- Luis Díaz (disambiguation), several people
- Matt Diaz (born 1978), American professional Major League baseball player with five successive franchises / teams and later sportscaster / commentator
- Miguel Díaz (baseball) (born 1994), Dominican baseball player
- Nate Diaz (born 1985), American mixed martial arts (MMA) fighter
- Nick Diaz (born 1983), American mixed martial arts (MMA) fighter
- Patricia Díaz Perea (born 1984), Spanish professional triathlete
- Raquel Diaz (born 1990), ring name of American professional wrestler and burlesque dancer Shaul Guerrero
- Rubén Toribio Díaz (born 1952), Peruvian footballer
- Salvador Diaz (born 1933), Venezuelan chess master
- Tony Diaz (born 1977), Dominican baseball coach
- Tony Diaz (American football) (born 2006), American football player
- Víctor Díaz (basketball) (born 1968), Venezuelan basketball player
- Yainer Díaz (born 1998), Dominican baseball player
- Yandy Díaz (born 1991), Cuban professional baseball player
- Yennsy Díaz (born 1996), Dominican Republic professional baseball player
- Yilber Díaz (born 2000), Venezuelan baseball player
- Yofrec Diaz (born 1999), Venezuelan baseball player
- Yunior Díaz (born 1987), Cuban athlete
- Yusniel Díaz (born 1996), Cuban baseball player

=== Others ===
- Adelaida G. de Díaz Ungría (1913–2003), Venezuelan anthropologist
- Antonio Díaz (disambiguation), several people
- Bartolomeu Dias (c. 1451–1500), first European known to have sailed around the Southern tip of Africa
- Ángel Díaz Balbín (1955–1986), Peruvian triple murderer and suspected serial killer
- Bernal Díaz del Castillo (1492 to 1496, precise birth date is uncertain–1584), Spanish conquistador
- California Odha Zertuche Díaz (1923–1991), Mexican civil engineer, first woman to graduate from the UNAM School of Engineering
- Elva Díaz, American neuroscientist, at the University of California at Davis
- Federico Díaz Legórburu (1915–2002), Venezuelan scouting leader
- Franklin Chang-Díaz (born 1950), former NASA astronaut from Costa Rica
- Louis Diaz (1946–2025), American Drug Enforcement Administration agent
- Matthew Diaz (born 1965), American military lawyer, formerly with the Judge Advocate General's Corps, United States Navy, later involved with controversial long-term prisoners / defendants held at Guantanamo naval base in Cuba
- Miguel H. Díaz (born 1963), American diplomat, former U.S. ambassador to the Holy See (Vatican City) of the Roman Catholic Church in Rome, Italy
- Virgilio Morales Díaz, one of the last National Chief Scouts of Cuban scouting up to c. 1961 when Scouting in communist Cuba was terminated

== Fictional characters ==
- Marco Diaz, a character in the animated series Star vs. the Forces of Evil
- MarkioDiaz, Italian artist originally from Bologna
- Miguel Diaz, one of the main characters of in the Netflix series Cobra Kai
- Rosa Diaz, a main character in the television series Brooklyn Nine-Nine

== See also ==
- Dias, the Portuguese cognate of Díaz
- Spanish naming customs
