= List of mayors of Alicante =

The following is a list of mayors (alcaldes) of Alicante since 1669.

== Mayors after the establishment of the statutes of Alicante in 1669 ==
Mayor	Political Party	Office started	Office ended	Note
Vicente Falcó Blanes	Military absolutist (Bourbon)	?	1705	
Francisco Martínez de Vera Bosch, I Marqués del Bosch	Military absolutist (Bourbon)	1705	1706	
Daniel O'Mahony	Military absolutist (Bourbon)	1706	1706	Surrendered to British 24 August 1706
Richard Gorges	Military (British)	1706	1707	
John Richards	Military (British)	1707	1709	Killed during the Siege of Alicante
Patrice Misset	Military absolutist (Bourbon)	1709	1710	First Military governor Alicante Mayor. Irish-French officer in Bourbon service
Fernando Pinacho	Military absolutist	1710	1715	
José de Chaves	Military absolutist	1715	1721	
Juan de Cereceda	Military absolutist	1721	1723	
Conde de Roydeville	Military absolutist	1723	1727	
Alejandro de la Motte	Military absolutist	1727	1734	
Felipe Solís Gante	Military absolutist	1734	1741	
Alejandro de la Motte (2)	Military absolutist	1741	1746	
Antonio de Alós de Rius, I Marqués de Alós	Military absolutist	1746	1760	
José Ladrón de Guevara	Military absolutist	1760	1767	
Guillaume René de Baillencourt, I Count of Baillencourt	Military absolutist	1767	1775	
Jorge Dunant	Military absolutist	1775	1783	
Francisco Poveda	Military absolutist	1783	1793	
José Antonio Romeo	Military absolutist	1793	1797	
José de Alós Bru, II Marqués de Alós	Military absolutist	1797	1798	
José Senmanat	Corregidor	1798	1804	
José Betegón Blanco de Salcedo	Corregidor	1804	1809	
Cayetano de Iriarte	Corregidor	1809	1811	
Antonio de la Cruz	Corregidor	1811	1812	
José Sanjuán	Corregidor	March 1812	August 1812	
Nicolás Scorcia Ladrón Pascual del Pobil, II Count of Soto Ameno	Aristocratic liberal	1812	1813	
Manuel Soler de Vargas	Bourgeoisie	1813	1813	
Tomás Pro	Absolutist	1814	1814	
Luis Riquelme	Corregidor	1814	1814	
José Casimiro de Lavalle	Corregidor	1814	1814	
Fernando Sante-Croix	Corregidor	1815	1819	
Wenceslao Prieto de la Rosa	Corregidor	1819	1820	
Pablo Miranda Salanova	Corregidor	1820	1820	
Manuel Soler de Vargas (2)	Bourgeoisie liberal	1820	1820	
José Pascual del Pobil Guzmán, V Baron of Finestrat	Aristocratic liberal	1820	1821	
Pedro Vignau	Liberal	1822	1822	
Manuel Soler de Vargas (3)	Bourgeoisie liberal	1823	1823	
Pedro Fermín Iriberry	Corregidor	1823	1832	
Isidro de Diego	Corregidor	1833	1835	
José Pascual del Pobil Guzmán, V Baron of Finestrat (2)	Military absolutist	1835		
Rafael Bernabéu	Progressive Party	1835	1935	
Mariano Oriente	Liberal	1835	1837	
Miguel Mariano Pascual de Bonanza Roca de Togares	Moderate Party	1838	1839	
Manuel Carreras Amérigo	Progressive Party	1839	1840	
Rafael Bernabéu (2)	Progressive Party	1840	1840	
Mariano Oriente (2)	Liberal	1841	1842	
Antonio Campos Domenech	Unión Liberal	1842	1842	
Tomás de España Sotelo	Progressive Party	1842	1842	
Miguel Mariano Pascual de Bonanza Roca de Togares (2)	Moderate Party	1843	1844	
Cipriano Bergez Dufoo	Progressive Party	1844	1844	
Miguel Mariano Pascual de Bonanza Roca de Togares (3)	Moderate Party	1844	1847	
Tomás de España Sotelo (2)	Progressive Party	1848	1852	
José Minguilló Boluda	Moderate Party	1853	1853	
Rafael Pascual del Pobil Estellés	Moderate Party	1853	1853	
Domingo Morelló Segura	Moderate Party	1854	1854	
Manuel Carreras Amérigo (2)	Progressive Party	1854	1854	
Francisco Javier Riera Galbis	Progressive Party	1854	1855	
Pedro García Linares		1855	1856	
José Gabriel Amérigo Morales	Moderate Party	1856	1856	
José Adrián Viudes Gardoqui, II Marqués de Río Florido	Progressive Party	1856	1857	
José Miguel Caturla Pérez		1857	1858	
Anselmo Bergez Dufoo	Progressive Party	1858	1864	
Miguel Mariano Pascual de Bonanza Roca de Togares (4)	Moderate Party	1865	1866	
Juan Bonanza Roca de Togores	Conservative	1867	1868	
Miguel Colomer y Verges	Progressive	1869	1869	
Eleuterio Maisonnave y Cutayar	Republican	1869	1873	
Miguel Colomer y Verges (2)	Progressive	1873	1874	

== Mayors during the Bourbon Restoration ==
Mayor	Political party	Office started	Office ended
Antonio Mandado López	Liberal	1883	1884
José Soler y Sánchez	(interim)	1884	1885
Julián Ugarte	Conservative	1885	1887
Rafael Terol Maluenda	Liberal	1887	1890
Manuel Gómiz y Orts	Conservative	1890	1893
José Gadea Pro	Liberal Fusion	1893	1895
José Forner Pascual de Pobil (barón de Finestrat)	Conservative	1895	1897
José Gadea Pro	Liberal Fusion	1897	1899
Alfonso de Rojas y Pascual de Bonanza (barón de Petrés)	Conservative	1899	1901
José Gadea Pro	Liberal Fusion	1901	1903
Alfonso de Rojas y Pascual de Bonanza	Conservative	1903	1905
Luis Pérez Bueno	Conservative (interim)	1905	1905
Manuel Cortés de Miras	Liberal	1906	1909
Luis Pérez Bueno	Conservative	1909	1909
Ricardo Pascual del Pobil y Chicheri	Conservative	1909	1910
Federico Soto Mollá	Liberal	1910	1912
Edmundo Ramos Prevés	Liberal	1913	1913
Ramón Campos Puig	Conservative	1913	1915
Eugenio Botí Carbonell	Conservative	1915	1915
Ricardo Pascual del Pobil y Chicheri	Conservative	1915	1917
Manuel Curt Amérigo	Conservative	1917	1917
Ricardo Pascual del Pobil y Chicheri	Conservative	1917	1918
Antonio Bono Luque	Liberal	1918	1921
Juan Bueno Sales	Liberal	1921	1922
Pedro Llorca Pérez	Conservative	1922	1922
Antonio Bono Luque	Liberal	1922	1923

== Mayors during the dictatorship of Primo de Rivera (1923-1931) ==
Mayor	Political Party	Office started	Office ended
Miguel de Elizaicin y España	Liberal	1923	1924
Miguel Salvador Arcángel	Conservative	1924	1925
Julio Suárez-Llanos y Sánchez	Pro-monarchy	1925	1930
Florentino de Elizaicin y España	Conservative	1930	1930
Gonzalo Mengual Segura	Pro-monarchy	1930	1931
Ricardo Pascual del Pobil y Chicheri	Conservative	1931	1931

== Mayors during the Second Republic (1931-1939) ==
Mayor	Political Party	Office started	Office ended
Lorenzo Carbonell Santacruz	Radical Republican Socialist Party	1931	1934
Alfonso Martín Santaolalla	Radical Republican Party	1934	1936
José Pascual de Bonanza Pardo	Conservative	1936	1936
Lorenzo Carbonell Santacruz	Republican Left	1936	1936
Rafael Millá Santos	Spanish Communist Party	1936	1937
Santiago Martín Hernández	Spanish Socialist Workers Party	1937	1938
Ángel Company Sevila	Iberian Anarchist Federation	1938	1939
Ramón Hernández Fuster	Spanish Socialist Workers Party	1939	1939

== Mayors during the dictatorship of Francisco Franco (1939-1976) ==
Mayor	Political Party	Office Started	Office Ended
Ambrosio Luciáñez Riesco	Movimiento Nacional	1939	1942
Román Bono Marín	Movimiento Nacional	1942	1946
Manuel Montesinos Gómiz	Movimiento Nacional	1946	1949
Francisco Alberola Such	Movimiento Nacional	1949	1954
Agatángelo Soler Llorca	Movimiento Nacional	1954	1963
Fernando Flores Arroyo	Movimiento Nacional	1963	1966
José Abad Gosálbez	Movimiento Nacional	1966	1970
Ramón Malluguiza Rodríguez de Moya	Movimiento Nacional	1970	1973
Francisco García Romeu	Movimiento Nacional	1973	1976

== Mayors during the Transition (1976-1979) ==
Mayor	Political Party	Office started	Office ended
José Manuel Martínez Aguirre	Valencian Union	1976	1977
Ambrosio Luciáñez Piney (interim)		1977	1979
Pascual Coloma Sogorb (interim)		1979	1979

== Mayors since the Constitution of 1978 (1979-Now) ==
Mayor	Political Party	Office started	Office ended
José Luis Lassaletta	PSPV-PSOE	1979	1991
Ángel Luna	PSPV-PSOE	1991	1995
Luis Díaz Alperi	PP	1995	2008
Sonia Castedo Ramos	PP	2008	2014
Andrés Llorens (interim)	PP	2014	2015
Miguel Valor Peidró	PP	2015	2015
Gabriel Echávarri	PSPV-PSOE	2015	2018
Eva Montesinos (interim)	PSPV-PSOE	2018	2018
Luis José Barcala Sierra	PP	2018	now
