= Miguel Valor Peidró =

Spanish politician (1945–2024)

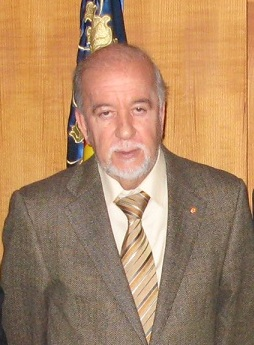
- Valor in 2015

Member of the Corts Valencianes for Alicante
- In office 23 May 1991 – 28 May 1995

Mayor of Alicante
- In office 15 January 2015 – 15 June 2015
- Preceded by: Sonia Castedo
- Succeeded by: Gabriel Echávarri

Personal details
- Born: 2 January 1945 Alcoy, Spain
- Died: 11 February 2024 (aged 79) Alicante, Spain
- Party: PPCV
- Occupation: Insurance agent

Miguel Valor Peidró (2 January 1945 – 11 February 2024) was a Spanish insurance agent and politician. A member of the People's Party of the Valencian Community, he served in the Corts Valencianes from 1991 to 1995 and was Mayor of Alicante from January to June 2015.

Valor died in Alicante on 11 February 2024, at the age of 79.
