= Luis Barcala =

Spanish politician

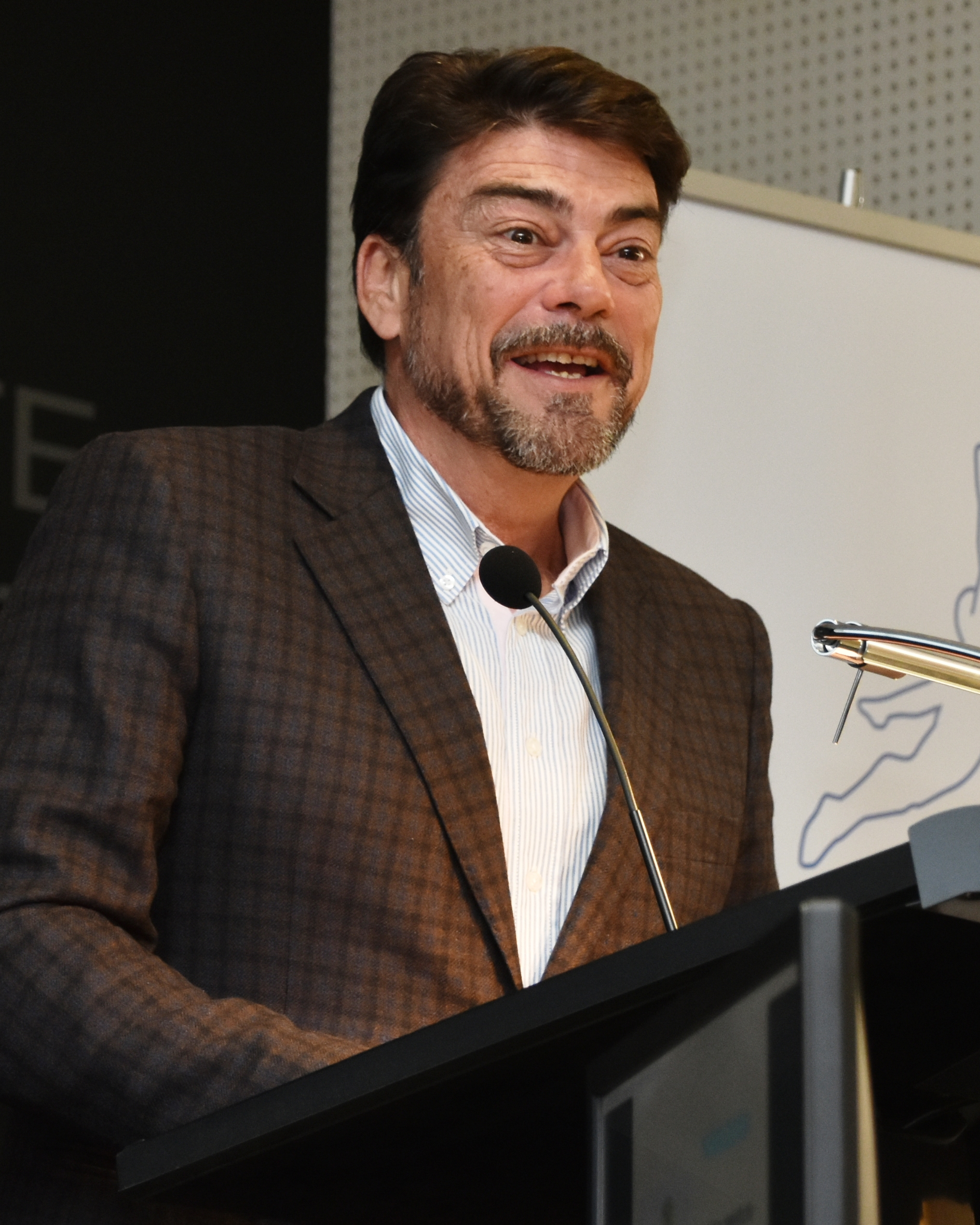

Mayor of Alicante
- Incumbent
- Assumed office 19 April 2018
- Preceded by: Gabriel Echávarri

Member of the City Council of Alicante
- Incumbent
- Assumed office 9 September 2011

Personal details
- Born: 19 March 1962 (age 64) Sant Joan d'Alacant, Spain
- Citizenship: Spanish
- Party: People's Party
- Profession: lawyer; politician

Luis José Barcala Sierra (born in 1962) is a lawyer and the current mayor of Alicante, Spain since 19 April 2018.

== Biography ==
Luis Barcala was born in Sant Joan d'Alicante. His father, Luis Barcala Muñoz, captain in the Spanish Air Force, died in a plane crash in Los Llanos, Albacete on November 19, 1974.

In his childhood, he was an athlete and in 1975 he won the Alicante provincial youth championship in 80 meters and 300 meter sprint.

Barcala holds an undergraduate degree in Law and a Master's degree in Foreign Trade from the University of Alicante. He also obtained a Master's degree in Business Labor Consulting from Cerem Business School, as well as a Master's degree in Banking Law.

He has been heavily involved in festivities of the Hogueras de San Juan. Since 1995 he has been a member of the "barraca" Els Chuanos (a social group that organizes activities during the event). In 1998 he became vice-secretary and in 2001 he became president of the barraca.

== Political career ==
In 2005, Luis Barcala joined the executive committee of the People's Party (PP) of Alicante as secretary of Study and Programs. In 2011, he became city councilor of Alicante after José Joaquín Ripoll resigned after being appointed president of the Port of Alicante.

In December 2013, he became councilor for Health and Environment in the administration of mayor Sonia Castedo. He resigned after the election of May 24th, 2015 when the Valencian Socialist Party (PSPV-PSOE), Guanyar Alacant (consisting of the United Left, Podemos, Green Party and the Socialist Alternative) and Compromis formed an alliance (holding 15 of 29 council seats) to remove the PP from the city government and made Gabriel Echávarri mayor.

=== Mayor of Alicante ===
On March 23, 2018, Gabriel Echávarri resigned after being indicted in several criminal cases, include allegations that he had fired the sister-in-law of Barcala in retaliation for the PP filing a criminal complain against him. PSPV-PSOE councilor Eva Montesinos became interim mayor, but city councilor Nerea Belmonte (who had previously been expelled from Podemos) abstained in the vote to confirm her. Since there was now no majority supporting an alternative candidate, Luis Barcala became mayor on April 19, 2018, as he had received the most seats in the 2015 election. There was an investigation into a possible attempt to bribe Nerea Belmonte to vote for Eva Montesinos, but the prosecutor closed the case due there being no evidence of a crime.

In the local elections of May 26, 2019, Barcala's People's Party won the most seats in Alicante, but did not achieve an absolute majority. With the help of Citizens, he received 14 of 29 council votes and was re-elected, as none of the other parties were able to form an alternative majority coalition and voted for their own candidates.

In 2023 local elections, with the collapse of Citizens, Barcala's People's Party increased their representation to 14 of 29 seats, allowing him to be reelected as mayor without the support from any coalition partners.
