= Luis Díaz =

Luis Díaz may refer to:

== Academics ==
- Luis Díaz Viana (born 1951), Spanish anthropologist
- Luis A. Diaz, American oncologist
- Luis Manuel Díaz Beltrán (Luis M. Díaz; born 1972), Cuban herpetologist

== Arts and entertainment ==
- Luis Días (composer) (1952–2009), Dominican composer and musician also known as "El Terror"
- Cipha Sounds (born 1976), stage name of American radio and television personality Luis Diaz

== Politicians ==
- Luis Diaz (politician), American politician, New York State Assembly member
- Luis Díaz Alperi (born 1945), Spanish politician, mayor of Alicante
- Luis Diaz Colon (born 1952), Puerto Rican politician, mayor of Yabucoa

== Sportspeople ==
=== Association football ===
- Luis Díaz (Costa Rican footballer) (born 1998), Costa Rican football midfielder
- Luis Díaz (footballer, born 1997), Colombian football winger (Bayern Munich, Colombia national team)
- Luis Díaz (footballer, born 2004), Colombian football forward (Envigado)
- Luis Díaz (Spanish footballer) (born 1995), Spanish football midfielder

=== Other sports ===
- Luis Díaz (cyclist) (1945–2021), Colombian Olympic cyclist
- Luis Díaz (baseball) (1971–2014), Cuban pitcher in Cuban National Series
- Luis Díaz (racing driver) (born 1977), Mexican auto racing driver
- Luis Díaz (volleyball) (born 1983), volleyball player from Venezuela
- Luis Díaz Alperi (born 1986), Mexican professional tennis player
