= Luis Díaz Viana =

Spanish anthropologist, philologist and writer

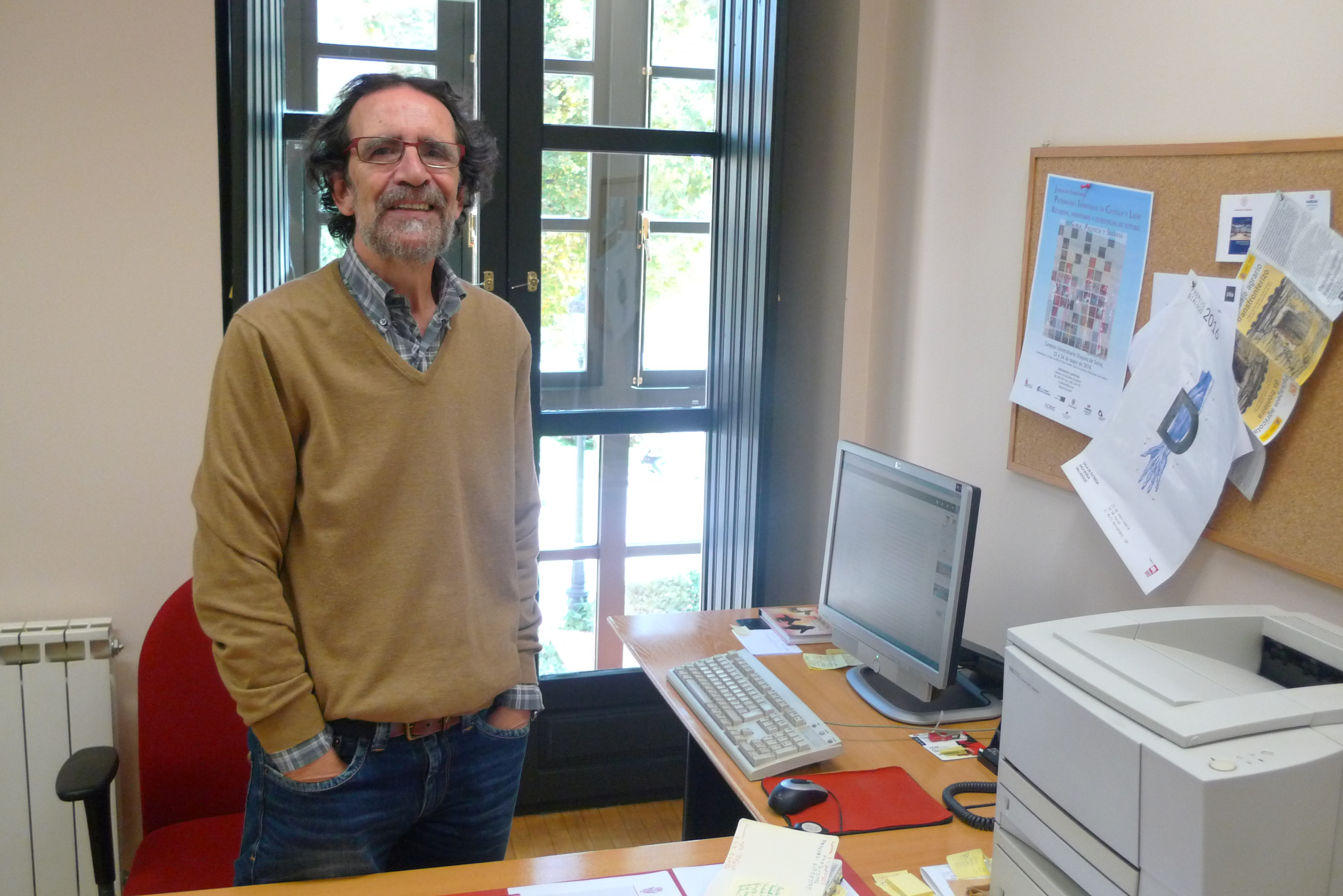
- Born: June 1951 (age 75); Zamora, Spain
- Education: University of Valladolid, BA, PhD
- Known for: Contributions to the development of Popular culture, Ethnology and Cultural identity
- Awards: Premio Castilla y León de Ciencias Sociales y Humanidades 2015
- Scientific career
- Fields: Anthropology, writer
- Workplaces: Spanish National Research Council, University of Valladolid

Luis Nicanor Pablo Díaz González-Viana (born June 1951 in Zamora), is a Spanish anthropologist, philologist and writer. He is considered a pioneer of Spanish anthropology specializing in popular culture, ethnology and identities. He is a researcher at the Spanish National Research Council (Consejo Superior de Investigaciones Científicas-CSIC).

== Academic career and contributions ==
=== Academic career ===
Díaz Viana studied 'Romance Philology' at the University of Valladolid, graduating in 1977. He obtained his doctorate in 1979 with the thesis titled The Oral Spanish Ballad in the province of Valladolid, published in the first two volumes of the Folklore Catalog of the Province of Valladolid). He was a professor at the Institute of Secondary Education in Soria, obtaining the position of Professor of Social Anthropology at the University of Salamanca in 1992, a position he held until 1995.

He is a research professor at the Spanish National Research Council (Consejo Superior de Investigaciones Científicas – CSIC), which he joined as a scientific collaborator in 1995. He was Head of the Anthropology Department of Spain and America, later ascribing to the anthropology area of the Institute of Language, Literature and Anthropology of the Center of Human and Social Sciences of the CSIC. In 2013 he became a research associate at the Institute of European Studies (University of Valladolid) as temporarily displaced staff (according to the CSIC-University of Valladolid agreement).

He was a research associate at the University of Berkeley from 1982 to 1984. He has also been a visiting professor at Berkeley, at the University of Texas at Austin and at the University of California at Los Angeles in the United States and at the National Autonomous University of Mexico (UNAM).

=== Research and contributions ===
Luis Díaz founded in 1978 the 'Castellano Center for Folkloric Studies' based in the Casa de Zorrilla in the city of Valladolid. Between 1984 and 1987 he was responsible for the 'Section of Ethnological Studies´ of the Council of Education and Culture' of the Junta of Castile and León, during that period conducting several courses on popular culture organized in collaboration with the University of Valladolid. Promoted in 1985 the first 'Scientific Congress on Ethnology and Folklore of Castile and León' and in 1999 the 'First international colloquium of chapbook literature'. He has chaired the Organizing Committee of the 'XII Congress of Anthropology of the Federation of Associations of Anthropology' of the Spanish State held in Leon in the year 2011.

He is a member of the Editorial Board of the Journal of Dialectology and Popular Traditions (CSIC), and director of the Collection of Ethnographic Sources `From Here and There´ (CSIC). He is or has been a member of different institutions: Instituto Florián de Ocampo, Centro de Estudios Sorianos, Seminary of Narrative Studies of the Catholic University of Peru, European Association of Social Anthropology (EASA), 'World Council of Anthropological Associations' (WCAA), President-elect of the "Association of Anthropology of Castile and León", which he helped to found in 1989. He is also an evaluator of the Standing Committee for Humanities of the European Science Foundation.

He participated in the research project of CSIC 'Sources of Spanish ethnography' led by Julio Caro Baroja who, along with professors of the University of Berkeley like Stanley Brandes and the folklorist Alan Dundes, Luis Díaz considers one of his teachers.

In the mid-1980s, he promoted research in urban anthropology with María Cátedra. He has been part of the research teams of projects like 'The Archive of Mourning' – about the popular expressions that took place after the attacks of 11 March 2004 – or like 'Justice, Memory, Narration and culture'.

He has directed the research project 'The return to the land. Where better than here? Dynamics and strategies of returnees to the countryside in Castile and León '(2013). Since 2012 he co-directs at the University of Valladolid, with Dámaso J. Vicente Blanco, the 'European Training Course in Management of Intangible Cultural Heritage' and directs the team of researchers who carry out the ethnographic pre-inventories of several provinces of Castile and León. In 2016, was published his book The Intangible Cultural Heritage of Castile and León: proposals for an ethnographic atlas (CSIC), a book that collects the works of several authors and that is constituted as a guide, ethnographic atlas and ethnological catalog of Castile and León.

From the first publications in the 70s of the 20th century, Díaz Viana claimed the importance of the philological tradition of folklore studies; pointing out the importance of the first contributions of foreign anthropologists for the history of Spanish anthropology.

For the anthropologist, of the analysis of the compilations of folklore it is deduced that the conception of the tradition and the traditional thing is a recent historical invention fixed in a canon built culturally from the romanticism and has strong ideological implications. The anthropologist Díaz Viana denounces the current acculturation when it is accepted without criticism by the overmodernity – technological fetishism and logic of economic progress – that inevitably distances us from the human reality. He also criticizes some proposals to protect the rural environment: a conservationist model of nature, landscapes and countryside that has left the people who still live in it as figurines dams on postcards that some administrations keep there only to be visited.

== Publications ==
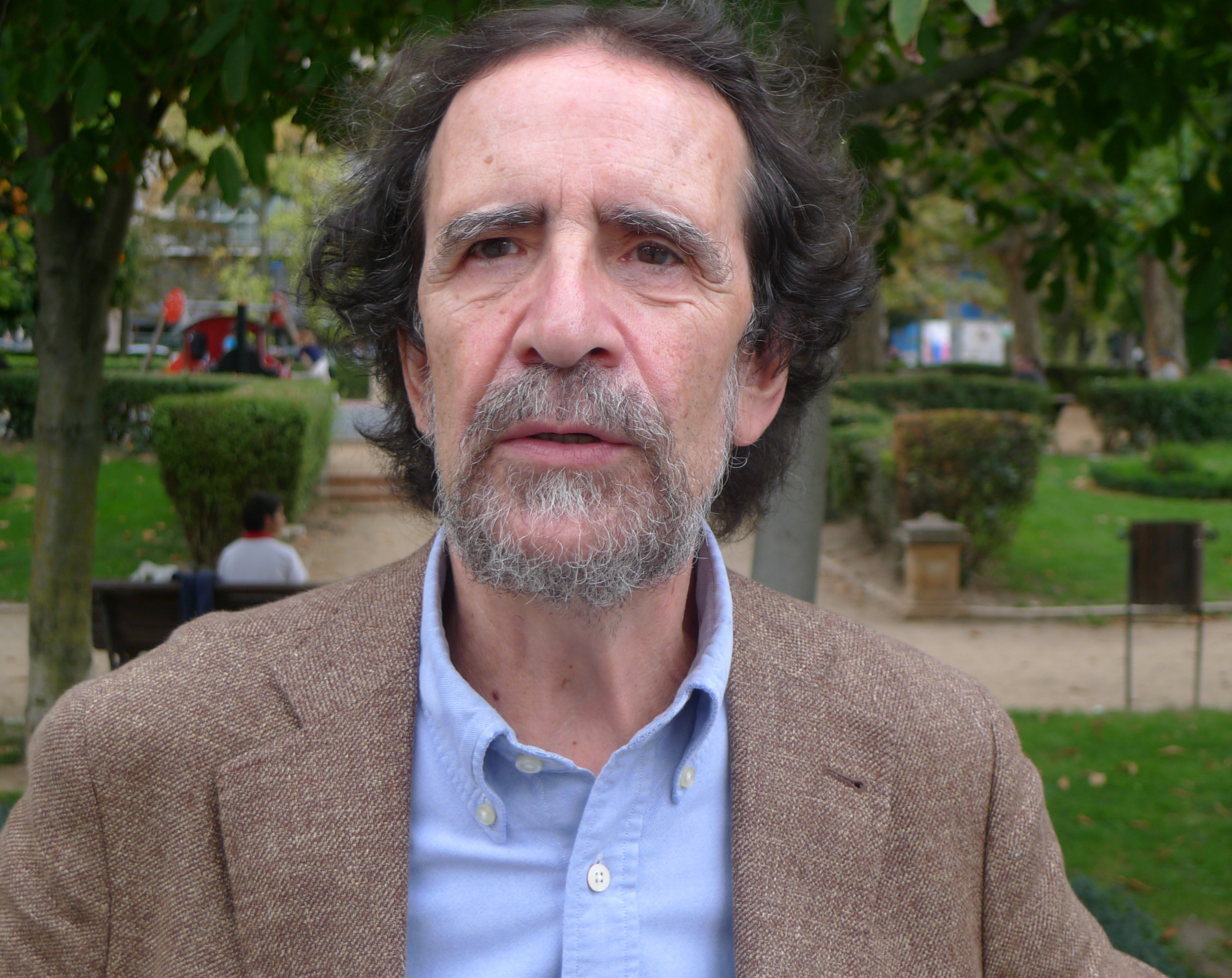
Luis Díaz Viana (Instituto de Estudios Europeos, Universidad de Valladolid, 2016

- Luis Díaz Viana, CSIC-CCHS.

Artícles

- Dialnet

Books

- Catálogo Folklórico de la Provincia de Valladolid (cinco volúmenes) (1978–1982);
- Rito y tradición oral en Castilla y León (1984);
- Canciones populares de la Guerra Civil (1985, reeditado en 2007);
- Aproximación antropológica a Castilla y León (1988);
- Cuentos populares de España (1992);
- Etnología y folklore de Castilla y León (1996);
- Castilla y León: imágenes de una identidad (1997);
- Los guardianes de la tradición. Ensayos sobre la ‘invención’ de la cultura popular (1999);
- Palabras para el pueblo. Aproximación general a la literatura de Cordel, 2 vols. (2000-2001).
- El regreso de los lobos: la respuesta de las culturas populares a la era de la globalización (2003);
- El nuevo orden del caos: consecuencias socio-culturales de la globalización (2004);
- La tradición como reclamo: Antropología de Castilla y León, en colaboración con Pedro Tomé Martín (2008);
- Leyendas populares de España. De los antiguos mitos a los rumores por Internet (2008);
- Narración y memoria. Anotaciones para una antropología de la catástrofe (2008).
- El patrimonio cultural inmaterial de Castilla y León: propuestas para un atlas etnográfico, various authors, CSIC, (2016). Edición a cargo de Luis Díaz Viana; Dámaso Javier Vicente Blanco, ISBN 978-84-00-10094-0
- Miedos de hoy: Leyendas urbanas y otras pesadillas de la sobremodernidad, ISBN 978-84-946681-9-7, (2017).

Poetry, novel and graphic work

- Todas nuestras víctimas (novel), Editorial Difácil ISBN 978-84-92476-68-8, Editorial Páramo ISBN 978-84-948403-5-7, 2018.
- Paganos (poetry); editorial Páramo, 2016.
- En Honor de la quimera (poetic anthology), Devenir /Juan Pastor, editor, 2015.
- Los últimos paganos (novel), Ediciones del Viento, 2010.
  - Los últimos paganos (dramatic version) Luis Díaz Viana & Agustín Iglesias, Diputación de Valladolid, 2018.
- Pagano refugio, (poetry), 1996.
- Habitación en Berkeley, (poetry), 1992.

== Awards and honors ==
- Medalla de Bronce del CSIC,
- Premio "Numancia" de Periodismo (1982),
- Premio Nacional de Investigación Cultural "Marqués de Lozoya" del Ministerio de Cultura al mejor artículo (1987),
- Premio Nacional de Folklore "Agapito Marazuela" (2006),
- Premio de Novela "Ciudad de Salamanca" (2009) por su obra Los últimos paganos,
- Premio Castilla y León de las Ciencias Sociales y Humanidades 2015 a toda su trayectoria.
- Premio Diálogo 2016 por su trayectoria individual de la Asociación Ateneo Cultural "Jesús Pereda" de CCOO Castilla y León.

== See also ==
- Anthropology
- Cultural anthropology
- Social anthropology
- Sociocultural anthropology
- Ethnology
- Ethnography
- Popular culture
- Cultural identity
