= María Cátedra =

Spanish anthropologist (born 1947)

- Born: 4 March 1947 (age 79); Lerida
- Other names: Tomás
- Citizenship: Spain
- Education: Complutense University of Madrid (degree) 1971, Complutense University of Madrid (doctorate) 1972, University of Pennsylvania (second doctorate) 1984
- Occupations: Anthropologist, Professor
- Employer: University of Complutense

María Cátedra, also known as María Cátedra Tomás, (b. 4 March 1947) is a Spanish anthropologist. She was born in the Spanish city of Lerida and completed her undergraduate degree from the Complutense University of Madrid in 1971. She received a doctorate from the same university in 1972, and a second doctorate from the University of Pennsylvania in 1984. She later became a professor of social and cultural anthropology at the University of Complutense. Her field research took place in Spain and Portugal, in the towns of Asturias, Ávila, and Evora. Cátedra's early work in Asturias in the 1970s examined perceptions of death, suicide, and the afterlife in the community, and made use of techniques from symbolic anthropology. This project would have an influence on later studies of death and suicide in the region. Cátedra later moved to working in Ávila, where she analyzed the political aspects of the saints of the town. For this project, she used both fieldwork and analysis of documents from archive sources. A 2004 biographical dictionary of anthropologists described Cátedra as a "pioneer of urban anthropology in Spain".
