= Hugo Díaz =

Hugo Díaz may refer to:

- Hugo Díaz (footballer, born 1987), Chilean footballer
- Hugo Díaz (footballer, born 1997), Spanish footballer
- Victor Hugo Díaz (1927–1977), tango, folklore and jazz harmonicist
- Hugáceo Crujiente, Spanish drag performer born Hugo Díaz
