= Yofrec Diaz =

Venezuelan baseball player (born 1999)

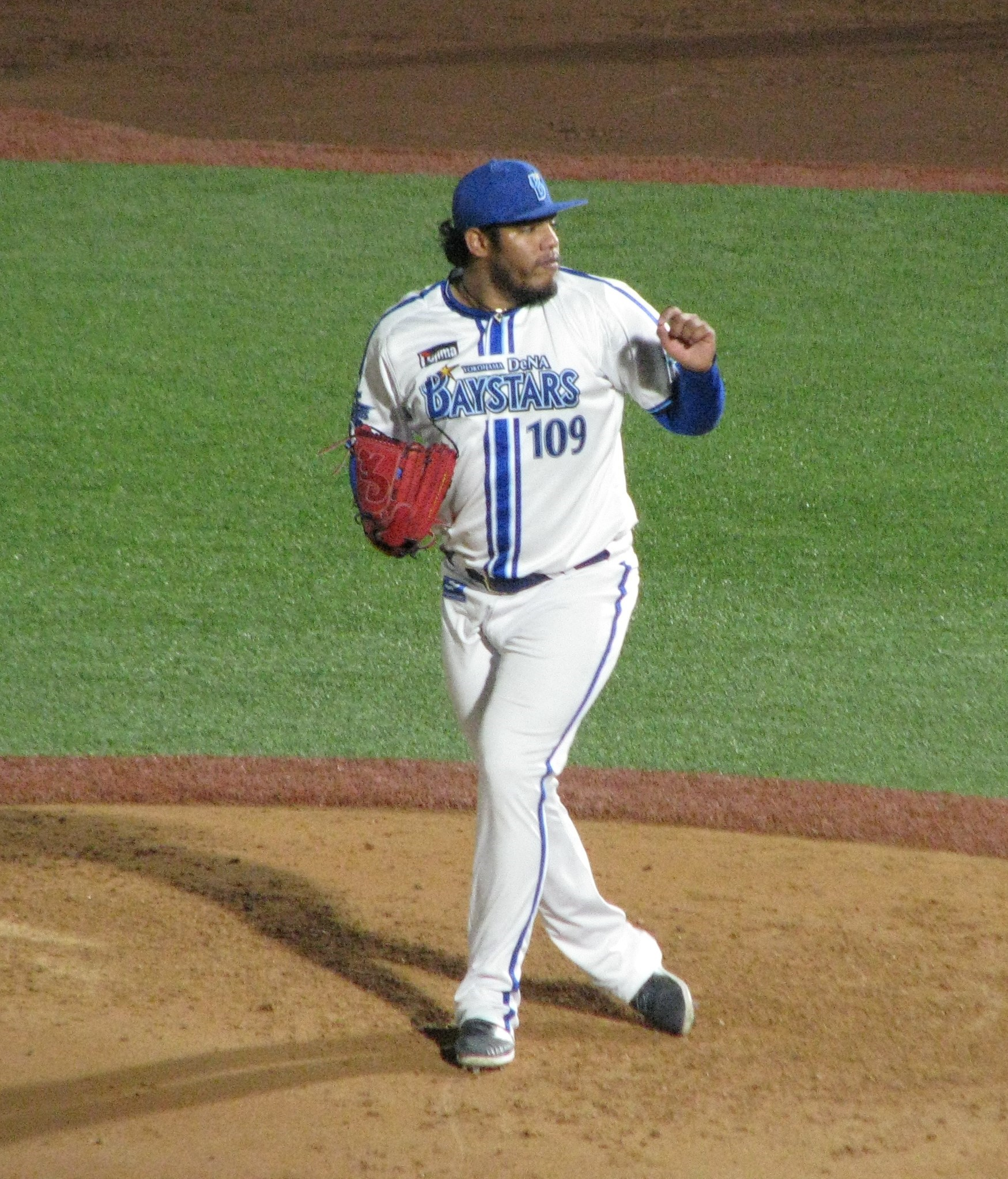
- Diaz with the Yokohama DeNA Baystars

Delfines de La Guaira – No. 74
- Pitcher
- Born: June 10, 1999 (age 27); Venezuela
- Bats: Left Throws: Left

NPB debut
- June 8, 2024, for the Yokohama DeNA BayStars

NPB statistics (through 2024 season)
- Win–loss Record: 0-0
- Earned Run Average: 0.00
- Strikeouts: 1
- Stats at Baseball Reference

Teams
- Yokohama DeNA BayStars (2020–2025)

Career highlights and awards
- Japan Series champion (2024)

Yofrec Diaz (born June 10, 1999) is a Venezuelan professional baseball pitcher for the Delfines de La Guaira of the Venezuelan Major League. He has previously played in Nippon Professional Baseball (NPB) for the Yokohama DeNA BayStars.

== Career ==
=== Yokohama DeNA BayStars ===
Diaz passed a tryout in the Dominican Republic and the Director Tatsuya Shindo inspected and acquired him. On November 20, 2019, he signed a development contract with the Yokohama DeNA BayStars with the uniform number 109.

=== Kanagawa Future Dreams ===
On June 18, 2020, both teams announced that Diaz would be sent to the Kanagawa Future Dreams of the Baseball Challenge League (BCL) along with other development players, excluding Kenjiro Tanaka.

In 2021, his arrival in Japan was delayed until April 3 due to the spread of COVID-19. On May 14, it was announced that he would be sent back to the Kanagawa Future Dreams of the BC League for the second consecutive year along with Starlin and Frandy Delarosa. He pitched in eight official Eastern League games, with a record of two wins and one loss and an ERA of 2.37.

=== Yokohama DeNA BayStars (second stint) ===
On January 8, 2022, Diaz arrived in Japan, but tested positive for COVID-19 in a PCR test at the Narita Airport, despite being asymptomatic, and was quarantined at a government-designated facility. He pitched in spring training, but on April 11, the team announced that he had undergone reconstruction surgery on the medial collateral ligament in his left elbow at a hospital in Yokohama. He did not pitch in any official games for the team, including the farm team, during the season, and became a free agent after the season ended due to regulations. However, he re-signed on November 29.

In 2023, he made his return on August 18 against the Tohoku Rakuten Golden Eagles in the Eastern League, pitching in five games. He returned to Japan on November 5 and participated in the Venezuelan Professional Baseball League during the offseason. On November 19, he re-signed, as he had done the previous year. His estimated annual salary is 6.6 million yen (equal to $46,372 in US dollars).

In 2024, he pitched in 14 games in the Eastern League, with a record of zero wins, one loss, one save, and an ERA of 3.29. Due to the fact that the first-team pitchers were suffering from injuries and poor performance, he signed a contract with Hayato Horioka on June 8, and joined the first team the same day. His uniform number was changed to 93. On the same day, in a game against the Fukuoka SoftBank Hawks (at the Yokohama Stadium), he made his first appearance in the first team in the top of the ninth inning, with one out and runners on first and second, just after the team was behind, and held the runners without allowing them to return. However, his new uniform number did not arrive in time, so he pitched with a three-digit uniform number. After that, he had a gap of nearly a month between appearances, and on July 3 against the Tokyo Yakult Swallows, he pitched as the second pitcher with the team leading by one point. He pitched well against the team's core, striking out all three batters in the first inning and recording his first hold. After pitching in two games, he was removed from the roster on the 13th.

Diaz did not make any appearances for the main club in 2025, instead posting a 1-0 record and 7.11 ERA with 18 strikeouts over 14 games. On July 19, 2025, Diaz was placed on waivers by the BayStars.

=== Acereros de Monclova ===
On March 16, 2026, Diaz signed with the Acereros de Monclova of the Mexican League. He was released prior to the start of the season.

=== Delfines de La Guaira ===
On May 19, 2026, Diaz signed with the Delfines de La Guaira of the Venezuelan Major League.
