= Patricia Díaz Perea =

Spanish triathlete

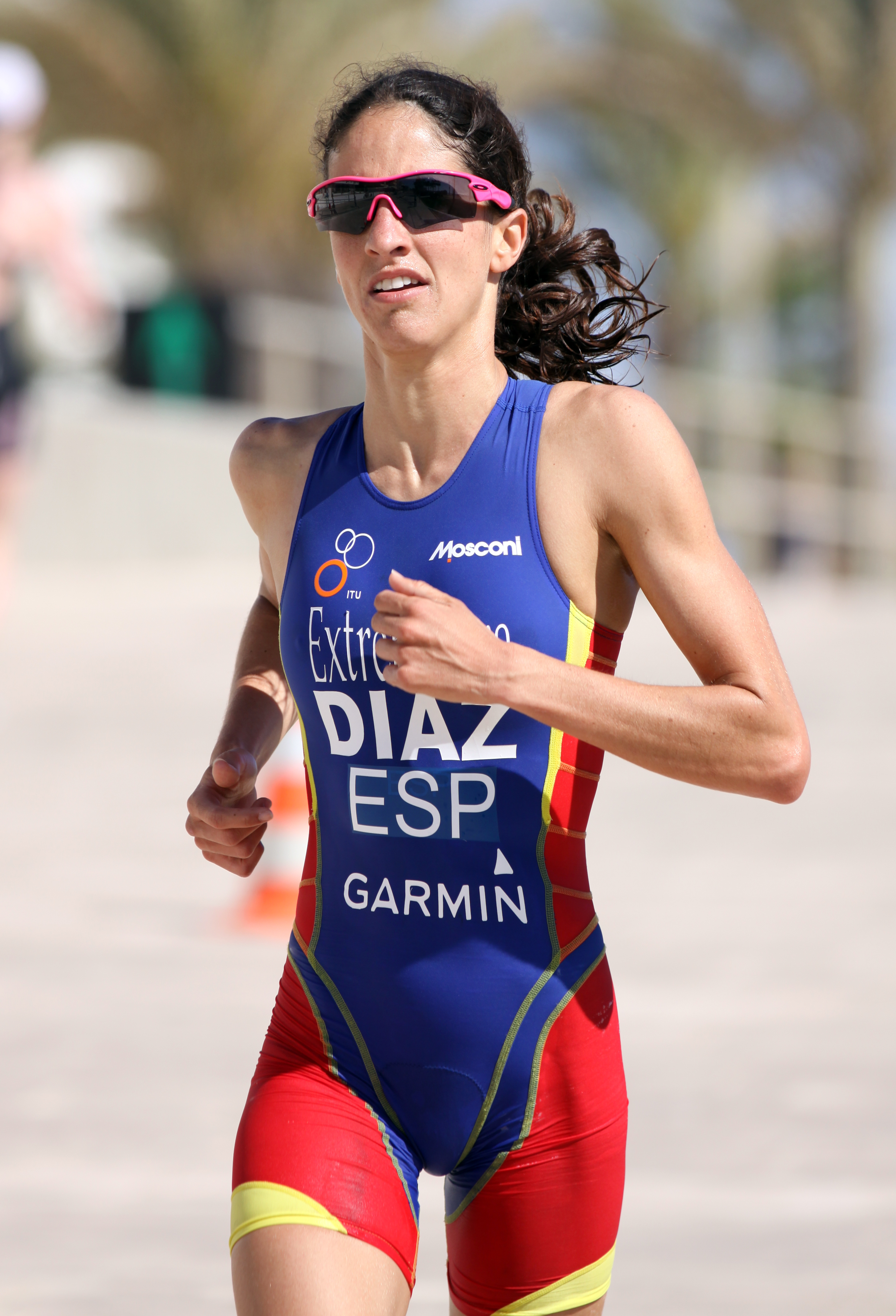
Patricia Díaz at the European Cup elite triathlon in Quarteira, 2011.

Patricia Díaz Perea is a Spanish professional triathlete.

She was declared "Best Individual Sports Woman 2009" by the Consejo Superior de Deportes, she is one of Spain's High Performance Athletes (DAN: Deportistas de Alto Nivel), and is a member of the Spanish National Team.

In Spain, Díaz represents the Lanzarote based triathlon club Triatlón Titanes. She studies Sports Sciences at the Universidad de Las Palmas de Gran Canaria.

== ITU competitions ==
In the five years from 2006 to 2010, Díaz took part in 15 International Triathlon Union (ITU) competitions and achieved 6 top ten positions.

The following list is based on the official ITU rankings and the ITU Athletes's Profile Page. Unless indicated otherwise, the following events are Olympic Distance Triathlons) and belong to the Elite category.

Date	Competition	Place	Rank
2006-07-08	European Championships (U23)	Rijeka	DNF
2007-06-16	European Cup	Schliersee	25
2007-08-19	European Cup	Geneva	12
2008-05-25	BG World Cup	Madrid	DNF
2008-06-27	9th World University Championship	Erdek	4
2008-08-24	European Cup and Small States of Europe Championships	Weiswampach	7
2009-04-05	European Cup	Quarteira	17
2009-05-17	Premium European Cup	Pontevedra	19
2009-05-31	Dextro Energy World Championship Series	Madrid	DNF
2009-06-14	European and Pan American Cup and Iberoamerican Championships	Ferrol	7
2009-07-18	European Cup	Athlone	6
2009-09-26	European Cup	Mar Menor	8
2010-05-28	10th World University Championship	Valencia	34
2010-08-15	European Cup	Geneva	7
2010-08-22	European Cup	Karlovy Vary (Carlsbad)	12
2011-04-03	European Cup	Antalya	23
2011-04-09	European Cup	Quarteira	11

BG = the sponsor British Gas · DNF = did not finish · DNS = did not start
