= Julio Díaz =

Julio Díaz may refer to:

- Julio Díaz (footballer, born 1948), Spanish footballer
- Julio Díaz (footballer, born 2005), Spanish footballer
- Julio Diaz (actor) (born 1959), Filipino actor
- Julio Díaz (boxer) (born 1979), Mexican boxer
- Julio Salvador y Díaz-Benjumea (1910–1987), Spanish general
