= María Arcelia Díaz =

María Arcelia Díaz (1896–1939) was a Mexican textile worker, union organizer and feminist. She was active in organizing with Casa del Obrero Mundial (COM) and the Regional Confederation of Mexican Workers (CROM) in Guadalajara the early twentieth century.

== Biography ==
Díaz was born in 1896 in Zapopan on the grounds of a textile mill to a family of weavers. She started working in the mill when she was eight years old. She was taught to read and write by her coworkers at the mill. At an early age, she began reading trade union publications and first helped organize a union at her workplace when she was fourteen years old. In 1914 the union that was organized at the textile mill affiliated with the Casa del Obrero Mundial (COM) and Díaz continued to hold a leadership role. She was fired for organizing and moved on, but later returned to the Guadalajara region.

In Guadalajara, she saw that labor protections such as minimum wage and eight hour workdays were not being respected by factory owners. Díaz also felt that various Catholic group associations, created to improve worker's lives in the area, were more concerned with worker morality than actual working conditions. At her mill, in 1922, she was an organizer of Unión Obrera de La Experiencia (UOLE). In 1923, she faced an attack on her life and was later fired by the factory. As politics shifted, Díaz earned a leadership role at a Regional Confederation of Mexican Workers (CROM) at La Experiencia and remained with them for several years. Díaz also worked as an honorary inspector for textile mills by the Department of Labor. In 1927, Díaz and seven other women formed the Círculo Feminista de Occidente which later affiliated with the Confederación de Obreros de Jalisco. In this capacity, she helped educate and advocate for women in the workplace. The organization also published a newsletter called Fémina Roja. Governor Silvano Barba González gave her an official social welfare inspector appointment in 1939. Díaz died that same year.

In 2018, her work as a labor organizer and women's rights in the workplace was centered in an exhibition held in Guadalajara. The exhibition, led by Florencia Guillen, incorporated art and history elements that described the fight for workers' rights and water usage in the textile mill at La Experiencia.
