= Gregoria Díaz =

Venezuelan journalist

- Born: 28 September 1964; Churuguara, Falcón state, Venezuela
- Died: 27 August 2023 (aged 58); Maracay, Venezuela
- Other name: Goya
- Education: University of Zulia
- Occupation: Journalist

Gregoria Díaz (28 September 1964 – 27 August 2023) was a Venezuelan journalist. Díaz worked as a journalist mainly in the state of Aragua, working as a correspondent for Crónica Uno and as a member of the board of the National College of Journalists in the state.

== Personal life ==
Gregoria Díaz had a son, Eduardo.
