= Joaquín Díaz de Vivar =

Argentine politician (1907–2002)

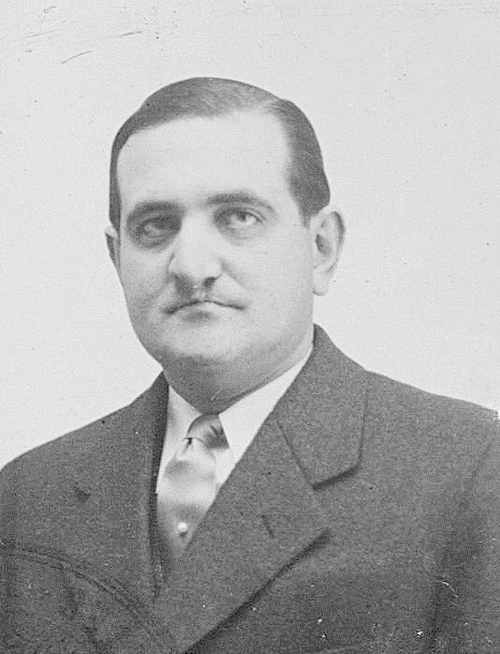

Deputy of the Argentine Nation for Corrientes
- In office April 25, 1946 – September 21, 1955

Ambassador of Argentina to Peru
- In office 1974–1976
- Preceded by: Carlos José Caballero
- Succeeded by: Jorge Chevalier

Personal details
- Born: June 4, 1907; Corrientes, Argentina
- Died: July 2002; Buenos Aires, Argentina
- Political party: UCR (1931–1945); UCRA; UCRJC (1945–1946); Peronist Party (1946–1955); Justicialist Party (1973–1976)

José Joaquín Díaz de Vivar (Corrientes, June 4, 1907 – Buenos Aires, July 2002) was an Argentine lawyer and politician of the Peronist Party, who served as national deputy for the province of Corrientes between 1946 and 1955. In addition, he also served as ambassador of Argentina in Peru.

== Biography ==
He was born in the city of Corrientes in 1907, being a descendant of the viceregal official Pedro Díaz de Vivar y González de Buendía. His father, Justo Díaz de Vivar, was elected national deputy for the Radical Antipersonalist Civic Union of Corrientes in 1926. His paternal grandfather, Eudoro Felipe Díaz de Vivar, was a prominent and active political activist in the province who, through letters and action, He defended the postulates of the Liberal Party of Corrientes and was an unconditional ally of General Bartolomé Mitre while his maternal grandfather, Joaquín Vedoya, was active in the Autonomist Party of Corrientes and became vice-governor of Manuel Derqui between 1883 and 1886. He dedicated himself to activity in the agricultural sector.

He studied law at the Faculty of Law and Social Sciences of the University of Buenos Aires, where he later became a professor, specialising in political and international law.

Originally a member of the Radical Antipersonalist Civic Union, he was a member of the Chamber of Deputies of the province of Corrientes, being vice president of the body in 1929.

In 1931 he joined the reorganization of the Radical Civic Union under Marcelo Torcuato de Alvear and became one of the most important leaders of the party in his native province between 1931 and 1945.

In 1937 he published the book Ideas para una Biología de la Democracia in which, inspired by Carl Schmitt, he criticised the demoliberal regime.

Díaz de Vivar supported the Revolution of '43 and three years later joined the nascent Peronism through the Unión Cívica Radical Junta Renovadora. He held a seat as a national deputy representing his native province between 1946 and 1955. One of his most notable interventions in the National Congress was the defense of the law that required all public schools in the country to teach catechism courses. Christian. His main argument was that Argentina was a Catholic nation due to its tradition.

In 1947, he was second vice president of the Chamber of Deputies (with Ricardo César Guardo being president). In addition, he was president of the External Affairs and Worship, and Justice commissions of said chamber. In that same year, he was also an Argentine delegate to the Inter-American Conference for the Maintenance of Peace and Security of the Continent in Rio de Janeiro (Brazil). The following year, he traveled to Mexico and Guatemala on a special mission.

The lawyer, who also worked as a professor at the UBA, was one of the main architects of the National Constitution of 1949, making evident the influence that Schmitt's work had on his thinking. He made arrangements for the university for which he worked to hire the German jurist as one of his teachers, but Perón himself vetoed the project due to the problems it could bring at an international level.

Supporter of vindicating the figure of Juan Manuel de Rosas and repatriating his mortal remains buried in England, he collaborated with the Juan Manuel de Rosas Historical Research Institute.

Between 1955 and 1957 he suffered persecution by the Liberating Revolution.

During the years of Peronism's ban he dedicated himself to managing the ranch that he had inherited from his father, but he remained linked to politics in the orbit of Catholic nationalism and the Peronist right. For this reason he accompanied Marcelo Sánchez Sorondo in 1968 in the creation of the National Revolution Movement.

In 1973 he was finally rehabilitated, occupying the ownership of the Argentine Embassy in Peru between 1974 and 1976, during the third government of Juan Domingo Perón and the government of María Estela Martínez de Perón. During those years it was rumoured that he would return to the country to take office as Minister of Foreign Affairs and Worship, but this did not finally happen.

Faced with the new fall of Peronism, he returned to his job as a rancher and retired from politics.

He died in Buenos Aires in July 2002.

== Selected works ==
- Ideas para una Biología de la Democracia (1937)
- Problemas Internacionales de Post-guerra
- Consideraciones acerca de la historia argentina
- Hacia la protección del patrimonio artístico, histórico y científico del país. Proyecto de ley (1948; co-authored by John William Cooke and Ernesto Palacio)
- Teoría de una constitución. El Estado de derecho y la Constitución justicialista de 1949 (1953)
