= Elva Díaz =

American neuroscientist (born 1970)

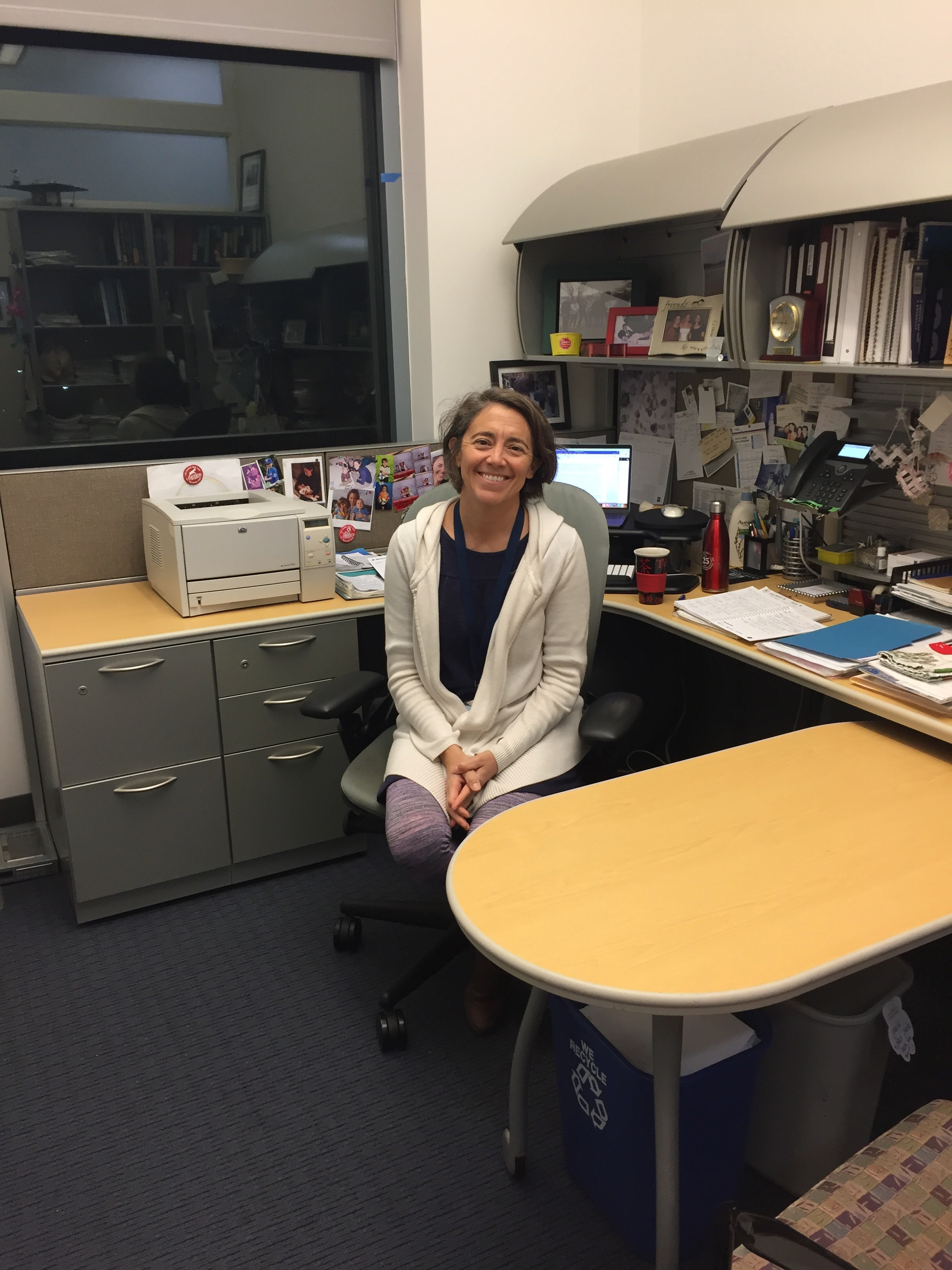
- Diaz in her office at UC Davis
- Born: San Jose, California
- Occupations: Professor, Department of Pharmacology at UC Davis

Academic background
- Education: 1993: B.A., Biochemical Sciences, Harvard University; 1999: Ph.D., Biochemistry, Stanford University; 2003: Postdoc, Developmental Neurobiology, UC Berkeley
- Alma mater: Stanford University
- Thesis: Molecular analysis of mannose 6-phosphate receptor trafficking (1998)
- Doctoral advisor: Suzanne Pfeffer

Academic work
- Discipline: Pharmacologist

Elva Díaz, director of the pharmacology department at UC Davis, is a researcher who specializes in developmental neurobiology, using rodents to study molecular mechanisms of brain development. Diaz is a recipient of the National Institutes of Health Director's New Innovator Award, as well as the UC Davis ADVANCE Scholar Award.

== Early life and education ==
Elva Denise Díaz was born in San Jose, California; her parents were of Mexican origin.

Díaz attended Harvard University for her undergraduate studies where she majored in Biomechanical Science. She earned a Ph.D. in Biochemistry at Stanford University.

== Research and career ==
Díaz's research focuses on the molecular mechanisms involved in the development, function, and plasticity of excitatory synapses in the central nervous system (CNS).

Díaz received a $40,000 Alfred P. Sloan Research Fellowship in 2004. The purpose of her research was "to better understand the function of certain molecules in the development of brain tumors — particularly in medulloblastomas, the most common form in children — to determine why they develop in the first place".

Díaz was also a 2009 recipient of a $1.5 million NIH Director's New Innovator Award. The purposes of her studies were, "1) to reprogram brain tumor cells toward a more stem-like phenotype, 2) to characterize the tumorigenic potential of such reprogrammed tumor stem-like cell lines, and 3) to identify chemical compounds that specifically target the reprogrammed tumor stem-like cells."

One of Díaz's core areas of research involves the exploration of the potential of pluripotent stem cells combined with immunotherapy to treat brain cancers. Her research has identified that tumor cells in the brain form pseudo synapses with the CNS to take over nutrients and mimic normal cellular communications.

Elva Díaz also investigates the dynamics of AMPA-type glutamate receptors, key components in fast synaptic transmission essential for memory in the brain. Díaz's team has identified a protein called SynDIG4 that regulates this receptor movement, potentially enhancing memory strength.

Díaz is chair of the UC Davis Neuroscience Graduate Program.

== Awards ==
- Helen Hay Whitney Fellowship, 1999
- Alfred P. Sloan Research Fellowship, 2004
- National Institutes of Health Director's New Innovator Award, 2009
- UC Davis ADVANCE Scholar Award, 2023

== Selected publications ==
- Matt, Lucas; Kirk, Lyndsey M; Chenaux, George; Speca, David J; Puhger, Kyle R; Pride, Michael C; Qneibi, Mohammad; Haham, Tomer; Plambeck, Kristopher E; Stern-Bach, Yael; Silverman, Jill L; Crawley, Jacqueline N; Hell, Johannes W; Díaz, Elva (February 27, 2018). "SynDIG4/Prrt1 Is Required for Excitatory Synapse Development and Plasticity Underlying Cognitive Function". Cell Reports. 22 (9): 2246–2253. doi:10.1016/j.celrep.2018.02.026. PMC 5856126. PMID 29490264.
- Chenaux, George; Matt, Lucas; Hill, Travis C; Kaur, Inderpreet; Liu, Xiao-Bo; Kirk, Lyndsey M; Speca, David J; McMahon, Samuel A; Zito, Karen; Hell, Johannes W; Díaz, Elva (October 21, 2016). "Loss of SynDIG1 Reduces Excitatory Synapse Maturation But Not Formation In Vivo". eNeuro. 3 (5). doi:10.1523/ENEURO.0130-16.2016. PMC 5073248. PMID 27800545.
- Kaur, Inderpreet; Yarov-Yarovoy, Vladimir; Kirk, Lyndsey M; Plambeck, Kristopher E; Barragan, Eden V; Ontiveros, Eric S; Díaz, Elva (July 20, 2016). "Activity-Dependent Palmitoylation Controls SynDIG1 Stability, Localization, and Function". Journal of Neuroscience. 36 (29): 7562–7568. doi:10.1523/JNEUROSCI.4859-14.2016. PMC 4951570. PMID 27445135.
- Kirk, Lyndsey M; Ti, Shu W; Bishop, Hannah I; Orozco-Llamas, Mayra; Pham, Michelle; Trimmer, James S; Díaz, Elva (August 1, 2016). "Distribution of the SynDIG4/proline-rich transmembrane protein 1 in rat brain". Journal of Comparative Neurology. 524 (11): 2266–2280. doi:10.1002/cne.23945. PMC 4892943. PMID 26660156.
- Barisone, Gustavo A; Ngo, Tin; Tran, Martin; Cortes, Daniel; Shahi, Mehdi H; Nguyen, Tuong-Vi; Perez-Lanza, Danial; Matayasuwan, Wanna; Díaz, Elva (July 10, 2012). "Role of MXD3 in proliferation of DAOY human medulloblastoma cells". PLOS ONE. 7 (7) e38508. Bibcode:2012PLoSO...738508B. doi:10.1371/journal.pone.0038508. PMC 3393725. PMID 22808009.
- Kalashnikova, Evgenia; Lorca, Ramón A; Kaur, Inderpreet; Barisone, Gustavo A; Li, Bonnie; Ishimaru, Tatsuto; Trimmer, James S; Mohapatra, Durga P; Díaz, Elva (January 14, 2010). "SynDIG1: an activity-regulated, AMPA- receptor-interacting transmembrane protein that regulates excitatory synapse development". Neuron. 65 (1): 80–93. doi:10.1016/j.neuron.2009.12.021. PMC 2822728. PMID 20152115.
- Yun, Jun-Soo; Rust, Jennifer M; Ishimaru, Tatsuto; Díaz, Elva (September 24, 2007). "A novel role of the Mad family member Mad3 in cerebellar granule neuron precursor proliferation". Mol Cell Biol. 27 (23): 8178–8189. doi:10.1128/MCB.00656-06. PMC 2169189. PMID 17893326.
- Dìaz, Elva; Ge, Yongchao; Yang, Yee Hwa; Loh, Kenneth C; Serafini, Tito A.; Okazaki, Yasushi; Hayashizaki, Yoshihide; Speed, Terrence P; Ngai, John; Scheiffele, Peter (October 24, 2002). "Molecular analysis of gene expression in the developing pontocerebellar projection system". Neuron. 36 (3): 417–434. doi:10.1016/s0896-6273(02)01016-4. PMID 12408845.
- Barisone, Gustavo A; Yun, Jun-Soo; Díaz, Elva (February 15, 2008). "From cerebellar proliferation to tumorigenesis: new insights into the role of Mad3". Cell Cycle. 7 (4): 423–427. doi:10.4161/cc.7.4.5413. PMID 18235219.
- Plambeck, Kristopher E; He, Chun-Wei; Navarro, Hector H; Díaz, Elva (April 8, 2022). "Mutually Dependent Clustering of SynDIG4/PRRT1 and AMPA Receptor Subunits GluA1 and GluA2 in Heterologous Cells and Primary Neurons". Frontiers in Molecular Neuroscience. 15 788620. doi:10.3389/fnmol.2022.788620. PMC 9024365. PMID 35465096.
