= Pedro Díaz de Vivar y González de Buendía =

Spanish official (1740–1820)

Pedro Díaz de Vivar
- Born: 9 October 1740; Fuensalida, Spain
- Died: 1820; Buenos Aires, Viceroyalty of Río de la Plata

Pedro Díaz de Vivar y González de Buendía (9 October 1740 — 1820) was a Spanish soldier and official who served in the Viceroyalty of Río de la Plata.

== Biography ==
Díaz de Vivar was born in the town of Fuensalida on October 9, 1740, the son of Lucas Díaz de Vivar and María González. He was a descendant of Rodrigo Díaz de Vivar, better known as El Cid.

Transferred to the Río de la Plata, he served as a soldier in the Buenos Aires Infantry Militia Battalion from 20 June 1761.

In June 1772 he was a second lieutenant of the Buenos Aires Cavalry Militia Regiment. Two years later he was promoted to lieutenant, in March 1780 to senior adjutant, and on 17 February 1781 to the rank of captain.

In 1777, after Cevallos' second expedition to Río Grande he was commissioned to lead 73 Portuguese prisoners of war and ten families to the town of Pergamino and Punta de San Luis.

In 1783, commanding 200 cavalry militia men, he carried out an expedition to the border of the town of Luján to help the forces that were fighting an invasion of Pampas Indians in the campaign.

In his service record, Inspector Tomás de Rocamora notes that he had "a lot of dedication, conduct and love of service."

In 1782 he was appointed Mayor of Buenos Aires and Councillor of the Royal Consulate of Commerce, and in 1794 he was appointed director of the House of Foundlings and the Royal Printing House of Foundlings.

On 14 May 1799 he was promoted by Viceroy Rafael de Sobremonte to 2nd commander and lieutenant colonel of the cavalry militias.

In 1801, as a result of the new Regulation of disciplined militias, he was appointed commander of the 2nd Cavalry Volunteer Regiment of Buenos Aires. Despite his advanced age, he took part in the defense of the city of Buenos Aires during the British invasion of the Río de la Plata in 1806.

For his services, he was awarded several leagues of land located in the current districts of Luján, Mercedes and in the Province of San Luis with which the Crown of Spain awarded him.

He was invited to the Open Town Hall on 22 May 1810, but did not show up. The invitation extended in his name is preserved with the handwritten legend that explains it: "Because it rained on the 22nd I did not go to the cavildo, I fear, the humidity, and the cold. I went with my son Marco on the 23rd at 9 ½/in the morning [sic], we passed [...] the brother of the Aguacil, Major Mancilla, and the [Honourable] responded to us that the Cavildo was already late, because the actas were closed.

After the May Revolution, he lived retired from public life, dissatisfied with the new order of things. He died in the city of Buenos Aires in 1820.

== Family ==
On 6 October 1766, he married Josefa Salinas Valdés y Barrancos with whom he had two children:

- Julián Mario Vicente Díaz de Vivar y Salinas-Valdés
- María Francisca Javiera Díaz de Vivar y Salinas-Valdés, who married Ventura Miguel Marcó del Pont y Angel, Trustee of the Commerce Consulate of Buenos Aires, procurator trustee of the Cabildo of Buenos Aires, royal lieutenant and captain of the Urban Militias.

Other descendants include:

- Joaquín Díaz de Vivar, ambassador and legislator, vice president of the Legislature of the province of Corrientes, vice president of the Chamber of Deputies of the Argentine Nation between 1947 and 1955 and conventional constituent (1949).
- Mario Felipe Díaz, was the manager and assembly chief of the Gigante cement grinding plant in the Province of San Luis.

In the work of Carlos Calvo, titled: "Nobiliario del Antiguo Virreynato del Río de la Plata" (1936–1943), the author emblazons the arms of Díaz de Vivar as follows: "Gules, a tree of sinople plucked and threaded with gold and a lion of this metal passing through its trunk. Silver border and in gules letters the motto: "AVE MARÍA GRATIA PLENA DOMINUS TECUM."

== See also ==
- El Cid
