= Luis Díaz Alperi =

Spanish politician and former mayor of Alicante

Luis Bernardo Diaz Alperi is a Spanish politician (People's Party) and a former mayor of Alicante.

Luis was born in Oviedo in 1945. He was mayor of Alicante from 1995 to 2008, having won four consecutive municipal elections.

During his tenure as Alicante mayor, the Ciudad de la Luz (a film industry) and Alicante Tram were opened. At the same time, he was accused of involvement in corruption.

On 11 September 2008, he resigned from the mayor post without giving any reason. He was succeeded by Sonia Castedo, also from the People's Party.
