= Sonia Castedo =

Spanish politician

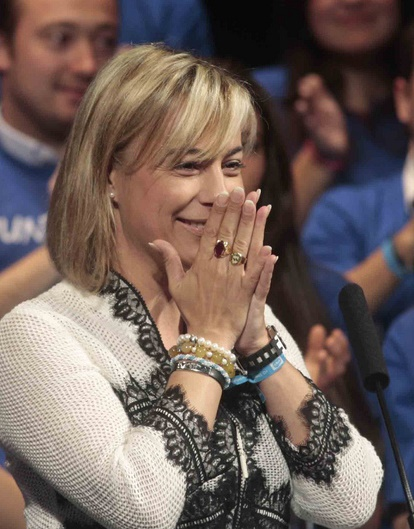
Sonia Castedo in 2014

Sonia Castedo Ramos (born 23 December 1970) is a Spanish politician and was mayor of Alicante until her resignation on December 23, 2014.

She was born in Ribadeo, Galicia in 1971, and has been living in Alicante since her childhood. She graduated from the University of Alicante with a degree in Sociology.

Her political career started in 1993 when she joined the People's Party (Partido Popular). In 1999 she was elected a member of Alicante City Council. In 2003 she became the first deputy to the mayor.

On September 17, 2008, following the resignation of Luis Díaz Alperi, Castedo was elected mayor of Alicante. She is the first woman to occupy this position.

She has been involved in several cases of corruption in the Valencia Autonomous Community and she was charged by the Valencian court of designing the town planning following particular interests and earning backhanding money for it. She resigned on December 23, 2014.
