= Harju =

Harju may refer to:

== Geography ==
=== Estonia ===
- Harju County, one of 15 counties of Estonia
- Harju, Hiiu County, a village in Hiiumaa Parish, Hiiu County.
- Pühalepa-Harju, a village in Hiiumaa Parish, Hiiu County, formerly known as Harju.
- Harju Bay, a bay in Saaremaa Parish, Saare County
- Harju Street, a street in Pärnu

=== Finland ===
- Harju, Helsinki, a quarter of Helsinki

== Other uses ==
- Harju (surname)
- Harju Elu, local newspaper of Harju County
