= List of streets in Tallinn =

This is a list of major streets in Tallinn, Estonia.

Estonian name	English translation	Other information	Image
Akadeemia tee	Academy Street	Named in reference to the campus of Tallinn University of Technology, which is located on the road	
Estonia puiestee	Estonia Avenue	Named after the Estonia Theater	
Harju tänav	Harju Street	Named after Harju County	
Karu tänav	Bear Street	Named after the local landowner Pyotr Medvedev, whose surname means 'bear'	
Katariina käik	St. Catherine's Passage	Named after Saint Catherine's Monastery in Tallinn	
Komandandi tee	Commander Street	Named after the Tallinn garrison commander's house	
Kopli liinid	Kopli Lines	Five streets in Tallinn's Kopli subdistrict, named after the similarly laid out lines of Vasilyevsky Island	
Kopli tänav	Kopli Street	The trunk road through the district of Põhja-Tallinn, connecting the main train station to the site of the former Russo-Baltic Shipyard	
Liivalaia tänav	Wide Sand Street	A continuation of the historical German name Breite Sandstraße 'Wide Sand Street'	
Magasini tänav	Magazine Street	Named after the artillery magazine that the street led to	
Narva maantee	Narva Road	Named after the town of Narva	
Paldiski maantee	Paldiski Road	Named after the town of Paldiski	
Pärnu maantee	Pärnu Road	Named after the town of Pärnu	
Peterburi tee	Petersburg Road	Named after the Russian city of Saint Petersburg	
Rataskaevu tänav	Draw-Well Street	Named after a well on the street first mentioned in the Tallinn Land Register in 1375	
Suur-Karja tänav	Big Drove Street	Named after its use as a drove to take cattle to pasture until 1768	
Telliskivi tänav	Brick Street	Home to the Telliskivi Creative City	
Tõnismägi	Tõnismäe Street	Named after Tallinn's Tõnismäe subdistrict, literally 'St. Anthony's Hill', named for a chapel dedicated to the saint	
Toompuiestee	Cathedral Avenue	Named after the Toompea hill in the old town, which the road partially encircles	
Torupilli ots	Torupilli Street	Named after the former Torupilli (literally 'bagpipe') tavern	
Vana turg	Old Market Street	Named after Tallinn's medieval marketplace	
Vabaduse väljak	Freedom Square	Named after the independence of Estonia from the Russian Empire in 1918	
Vana-Lõuna tänav	Old South Street	Named after its location south of the city center. The street bore another name during the communist era, and when the old name was restored in 1991 the epithet old was added to distinguish it from another street that had been named 'South Street' in the meantime.	
Vana-Viru tänav	Old Viru Street	Named after the Viru region; the street provided access to the old city gate and the road to Viru	
Vene tänav	Russian Street	Named after a trading yard of Russian (Novgorodian) merchants and an associated former Russian Orthodox church on the street	

== See also ==
- List of streets in Pärnu
