= Pelgulinn =

Subdistrict of Tallinn, Estonia

Coordinates: 59.441213°N 24.713852°E

- Subdistrict of Tallinn
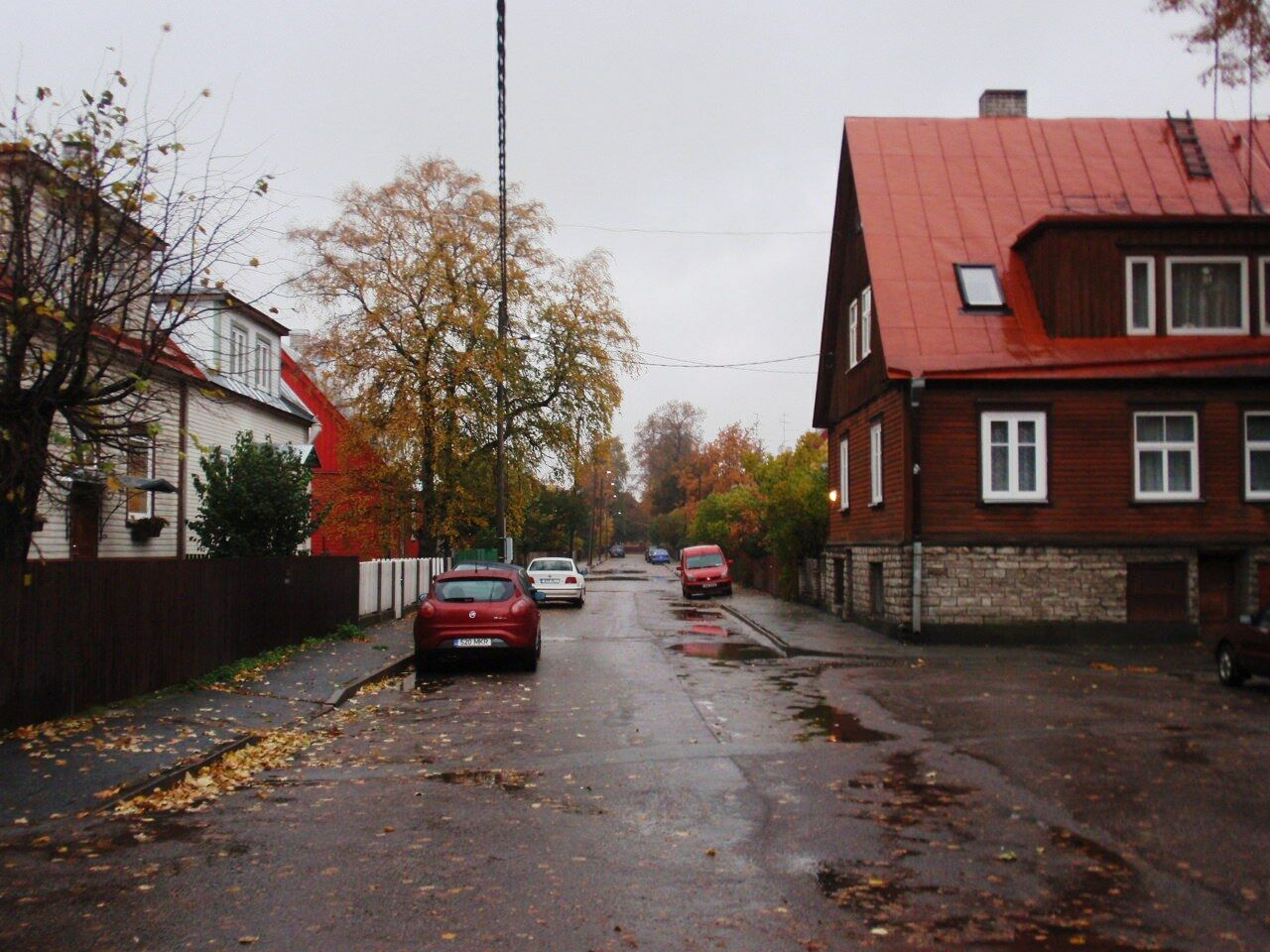
- Preesi Street with typical wooden apartment buildings from the 1930s

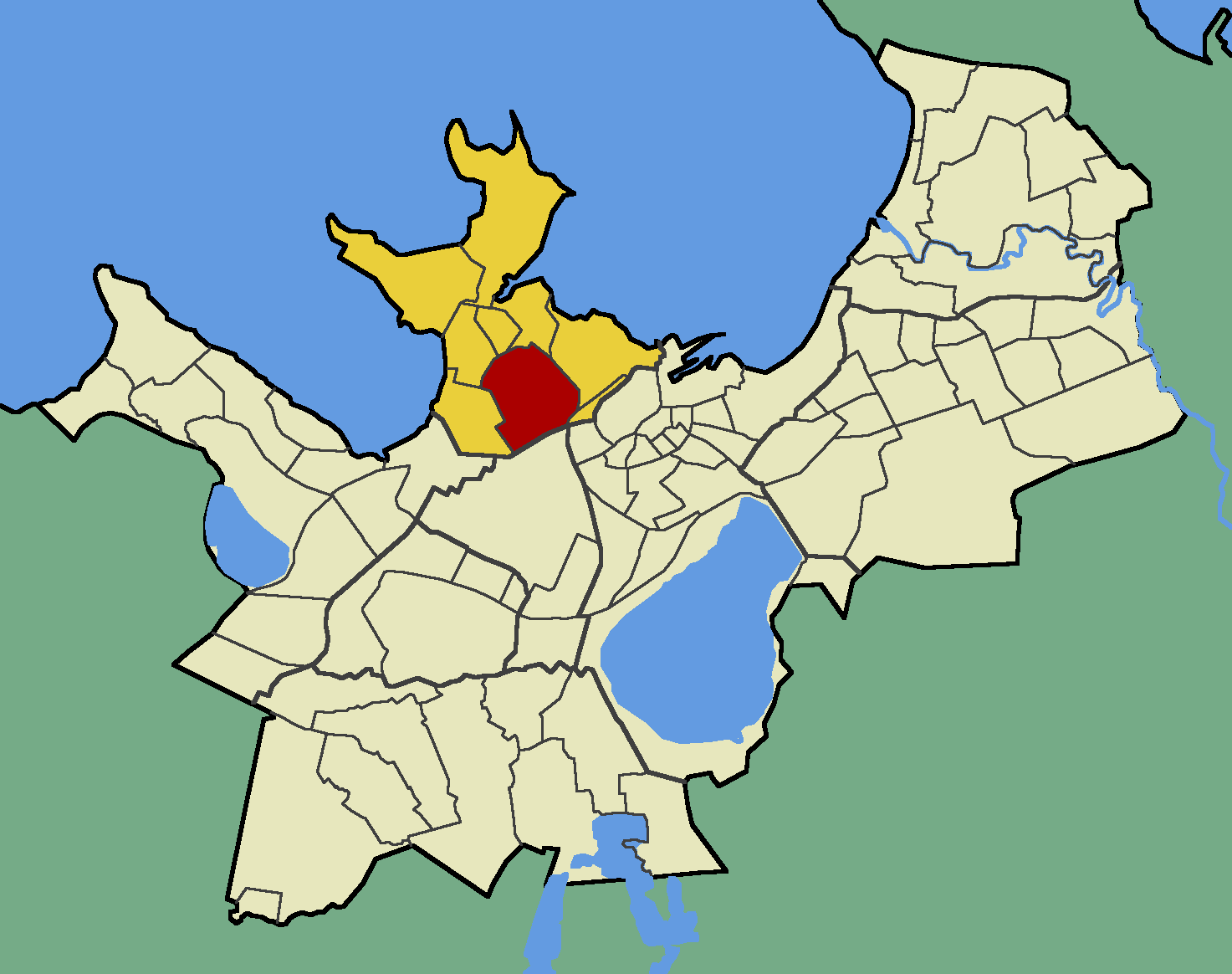
- Pelgulinn within Põhja-Tallinn
- Country: Estonia
- County: Harju County
- City: Tallinn
- District: Põhja-Tallinn

Population (1 January 2015)
  - Total: 15,949
- Website: www.pelgulinnaselts.ee

Pelgulinn (Estonian for 'refuge/hiding town') is a subdistrict (asum) of Põhja-Tallinn (North Tallinn) in Tallinn, the capital of Estonia. It is located about 2 km (1 mi) northwest of the city centre. Pelgulinn borders Kalamaja to the east, Kelmiküla to the southeast, Lilleküla to the south, Merimetsa to the west, Pelguranna to the northwest, and Karjamaa to the north. The subdistrict has a population of 15,949 (as of 1 January 2015).

In the 18th century, the area was largely covered by meadows and forests. It was used by criminals and outlaws as a hiding place, hence the name Pelgulinn, which refers to a hiding place. Pelgulinn started as a slum inhabited by the workers of Tallinn–Saint Petersburg railway at the end of the 19th century.

== Gallery ==
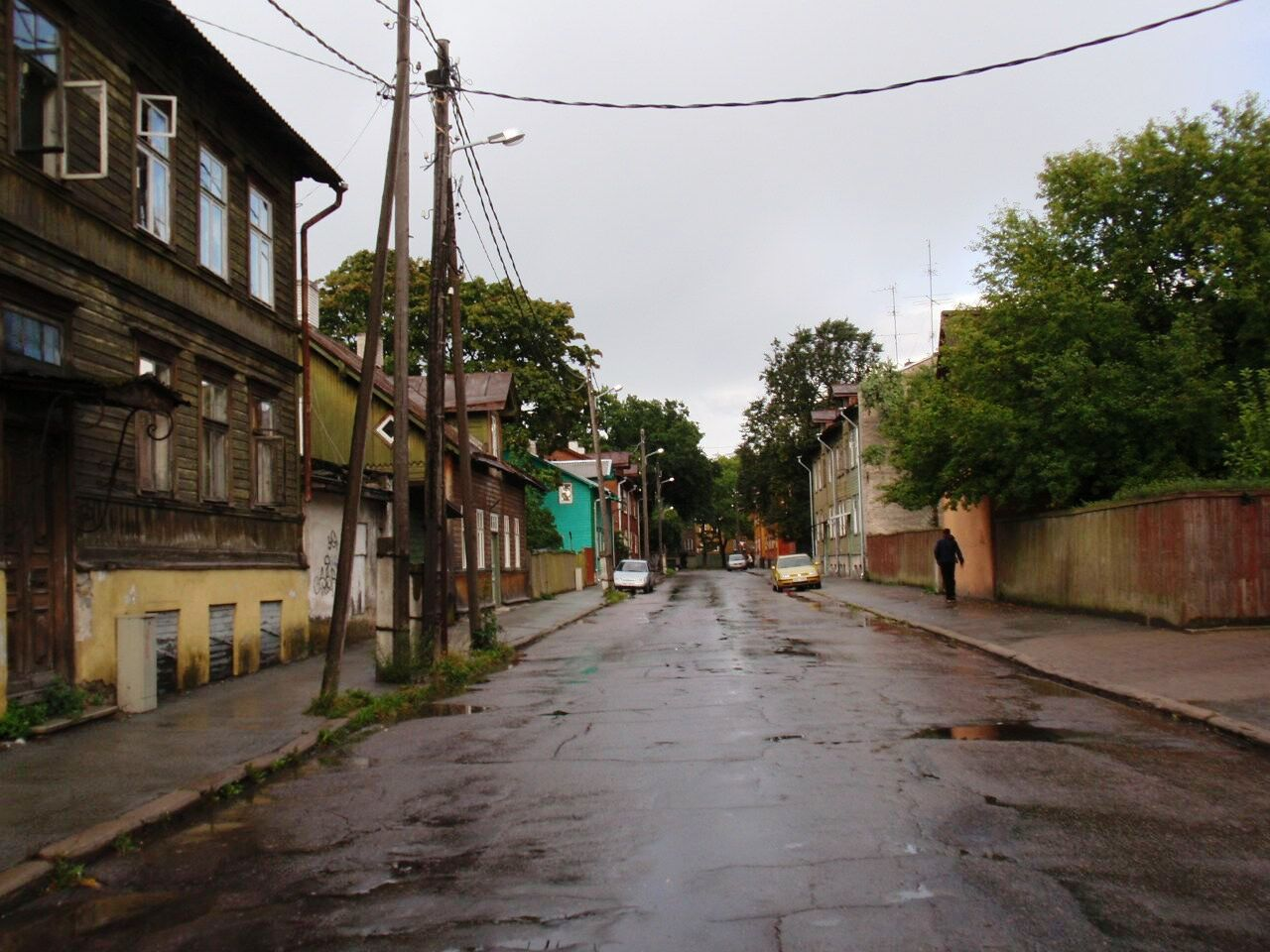
The oldest part of Pelgulinn, Härjapea Street

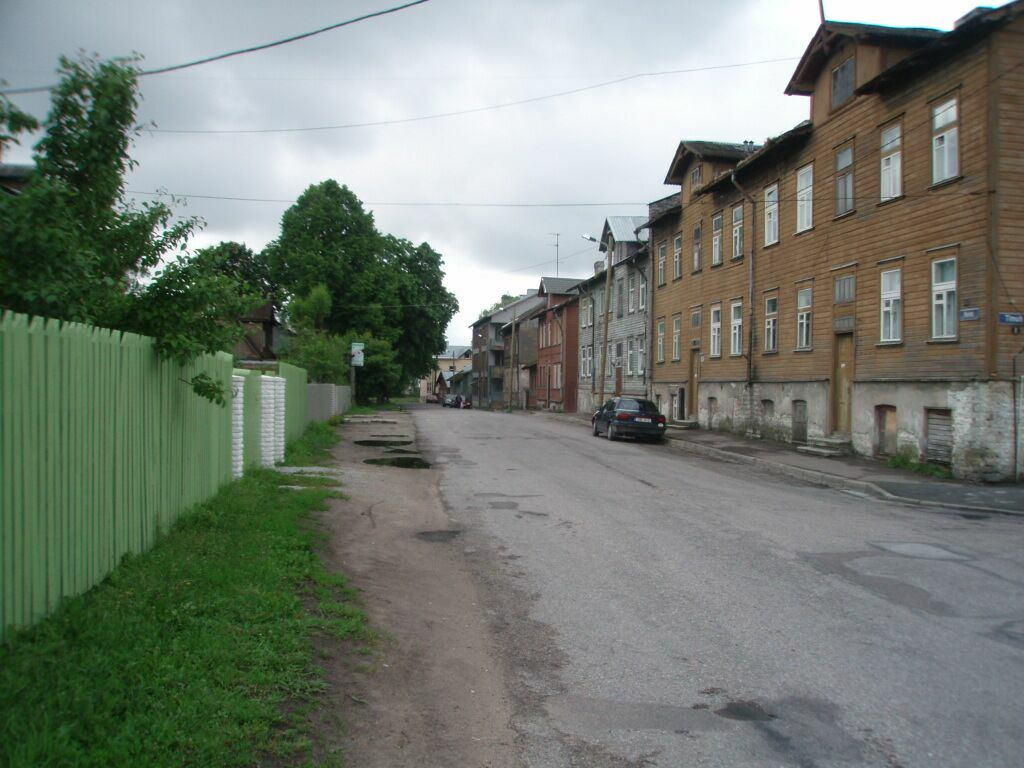
Heina Street near the Kopli freight station

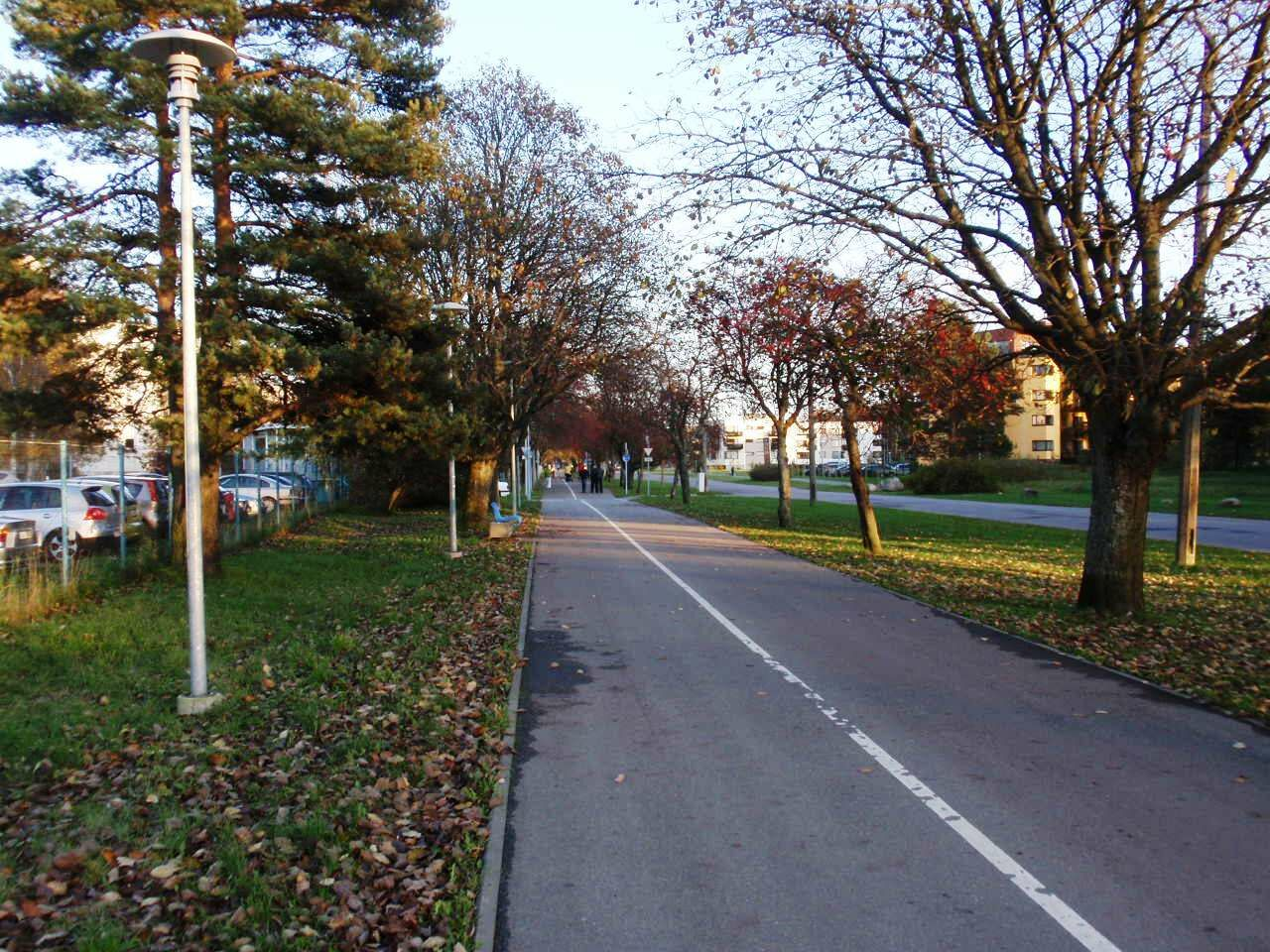
Kolde puiestee, an avenue leading to Stroomi Beach

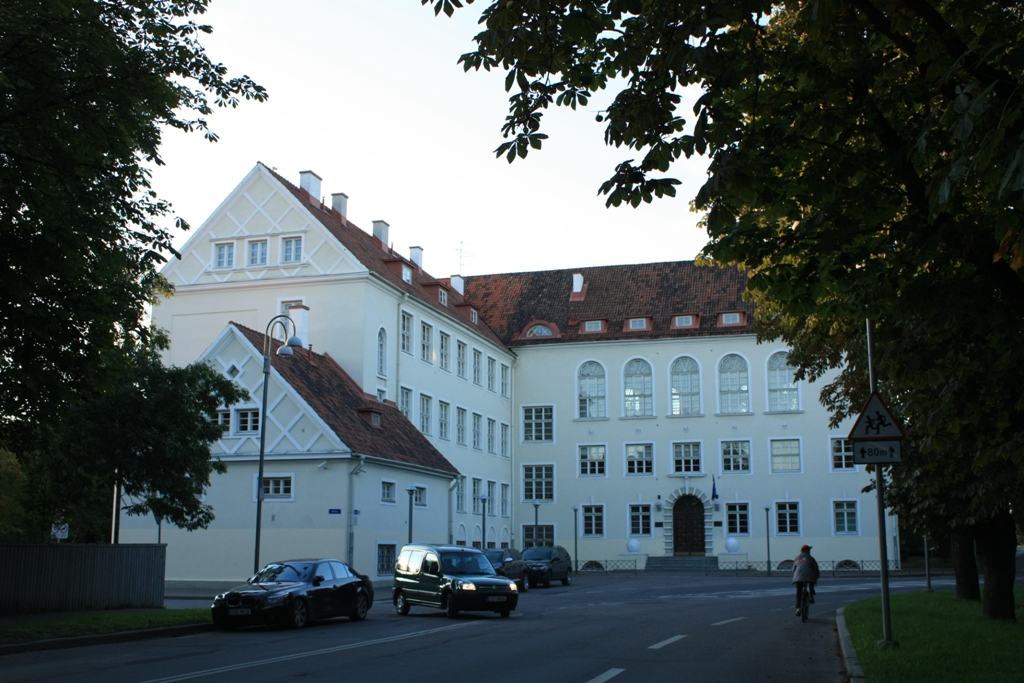
Ristiku Primary School

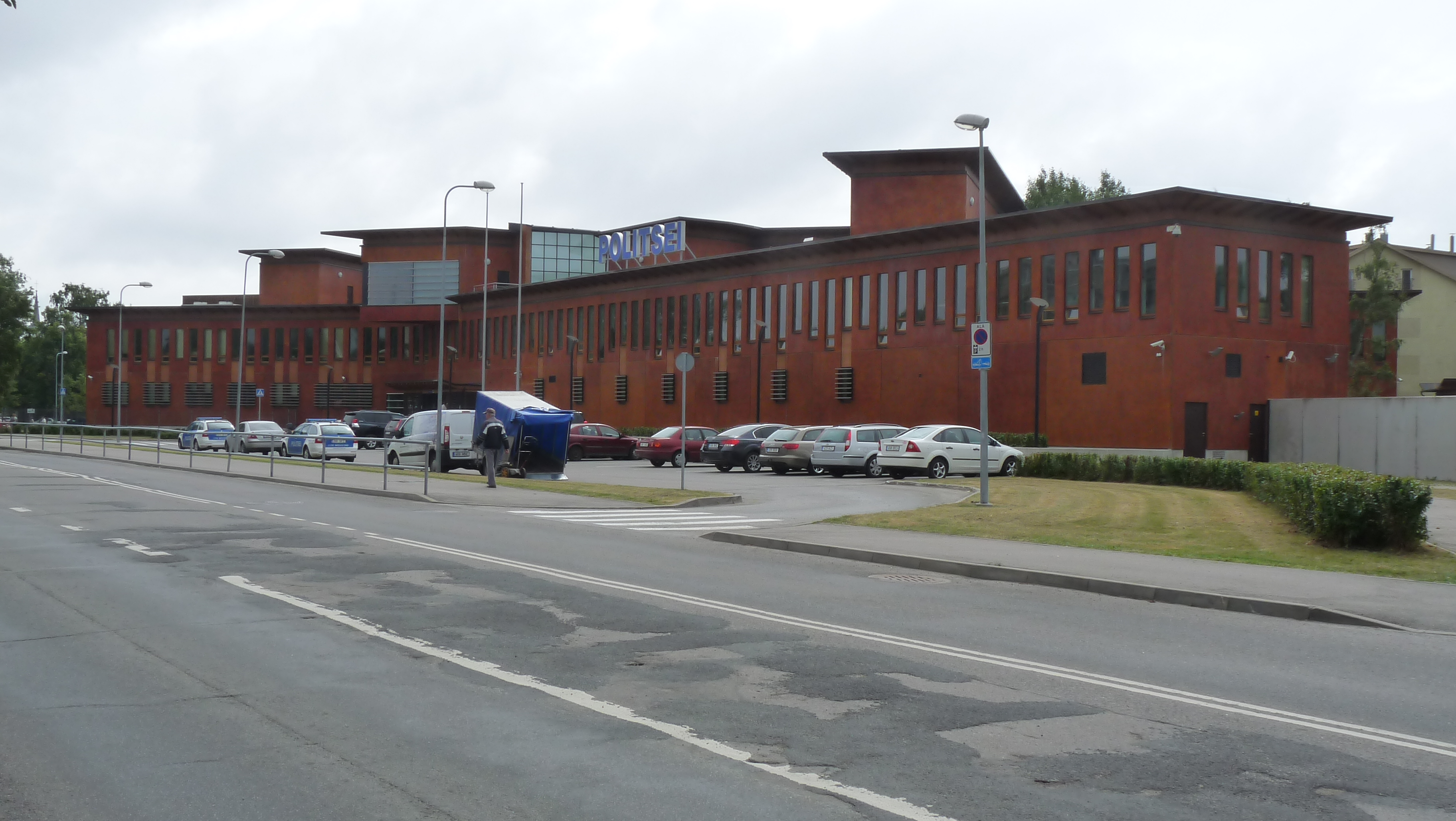
Police station

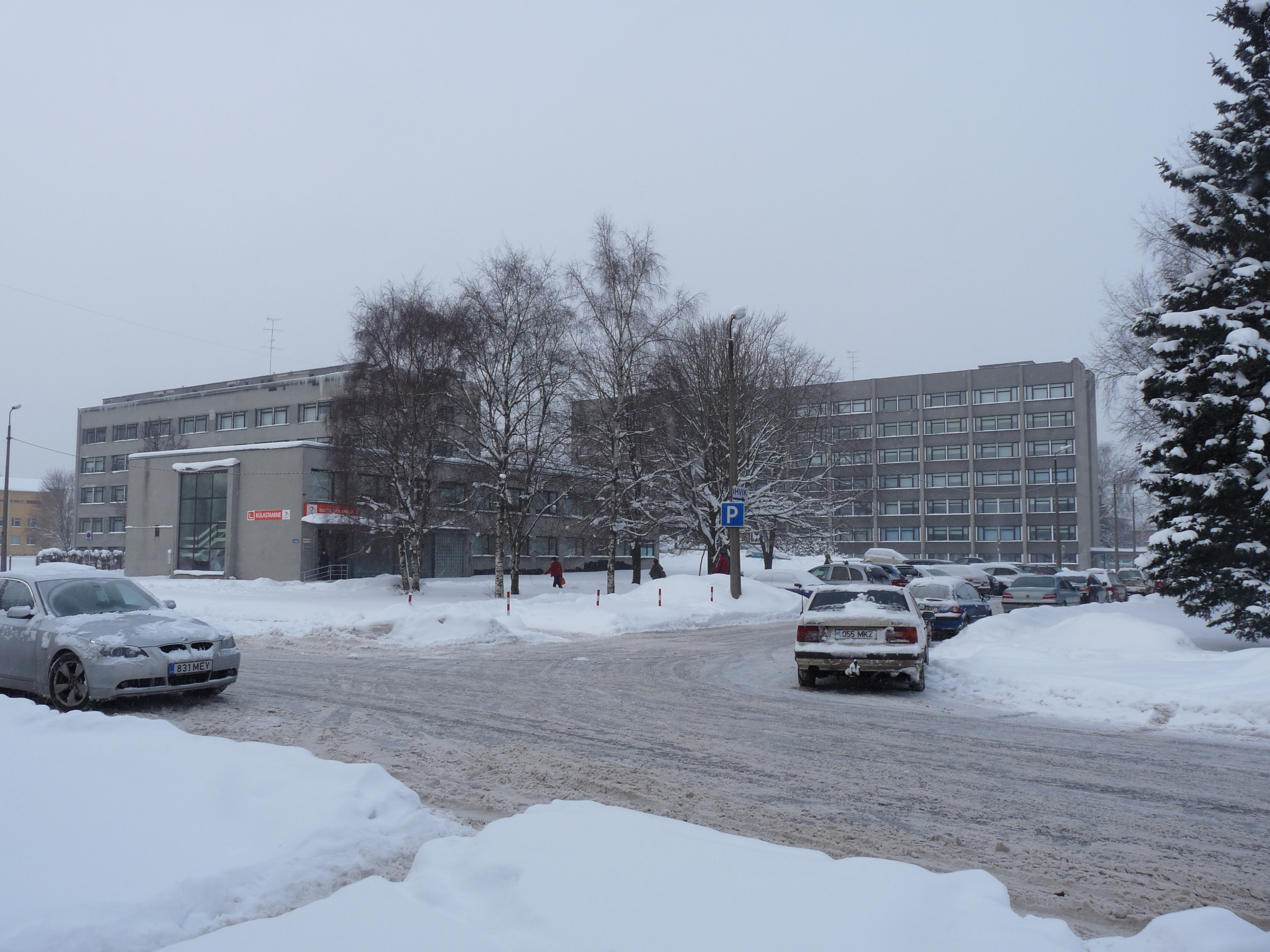
Pelgulinn Maternity Hospital
