= Sitsi =

Subdistrict of Tallinn, Estonia

Coordinates: 59.451818°N 24.702163°E

- Subdistrict of Tallinn
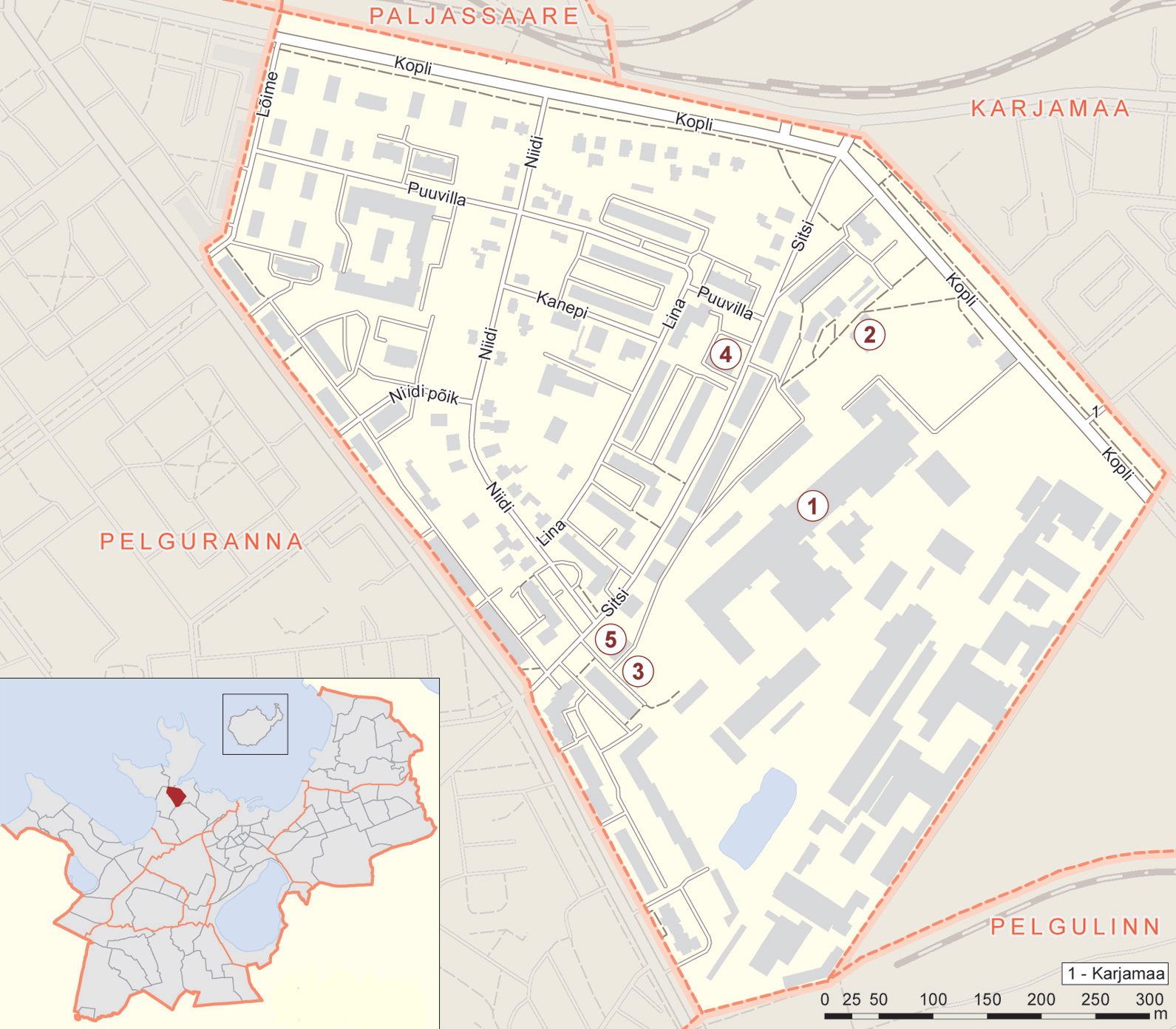
- Map of Sitsi Streets

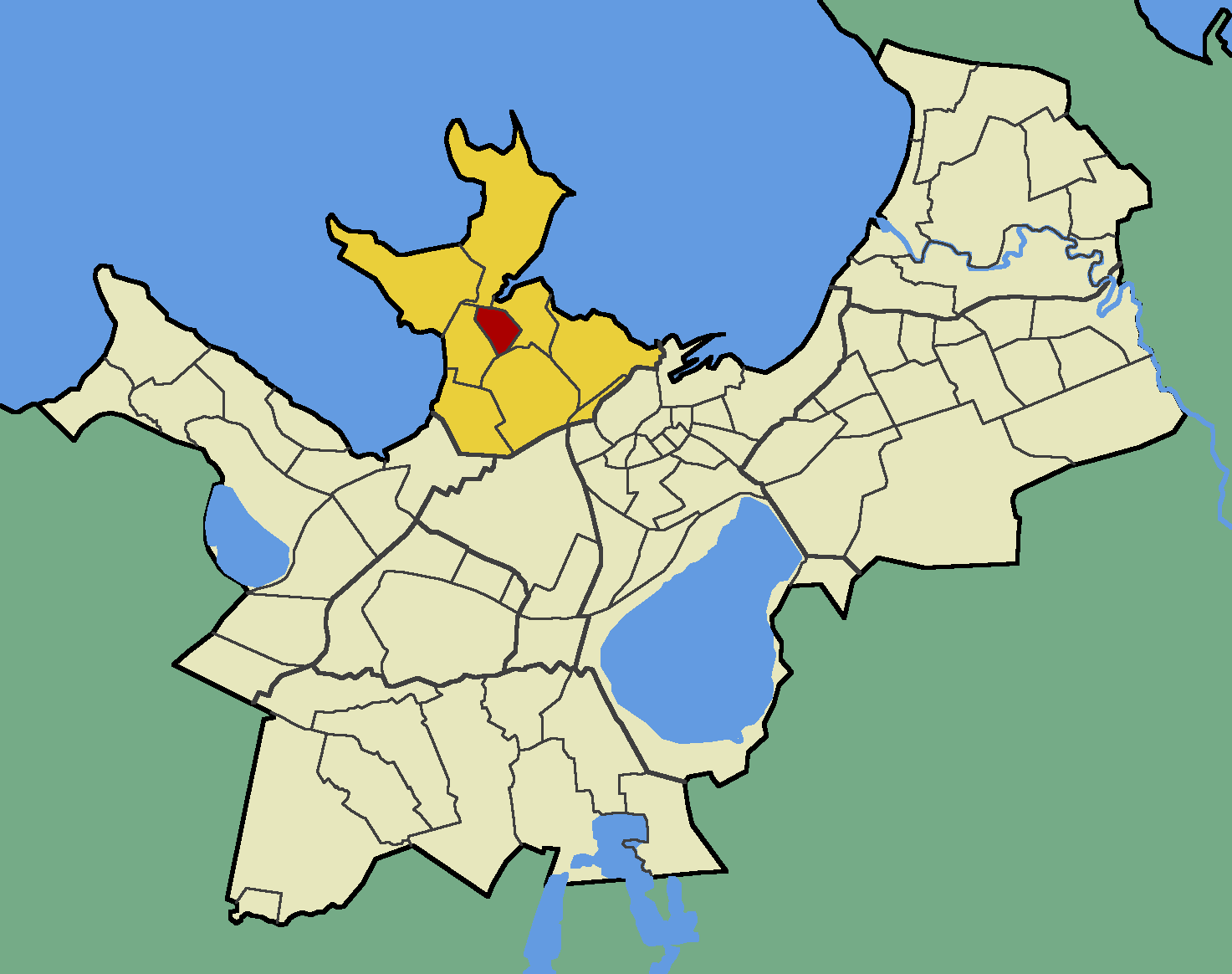
- Sitsi within Põhja-Tallinn.
- Country: Estonia
- County: Harju County
- City: Tallinn
- District: Põhja-Tallinn

Population (01.01.2014)
  - Total: 3,874

Sitsi (Estonian for 'chintz') is a subdistrict (Estonian: asum) in the district of Põhja-Tallinn, Tallinn, the capital of Estonia. It has a population of 3,874 (As of 1 January 2014).

== Gallery ==
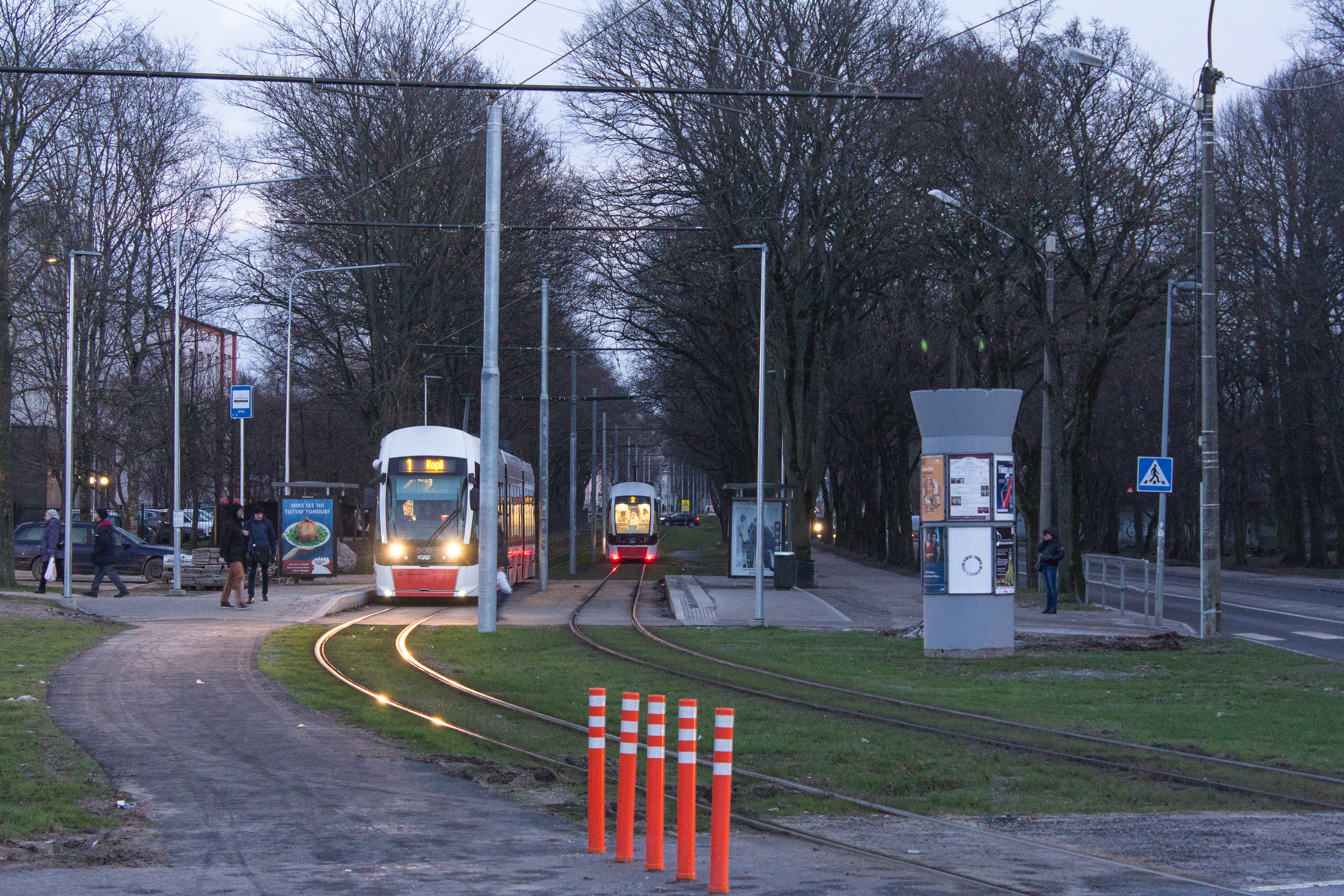
Sitsimägi (Chintz Hill)

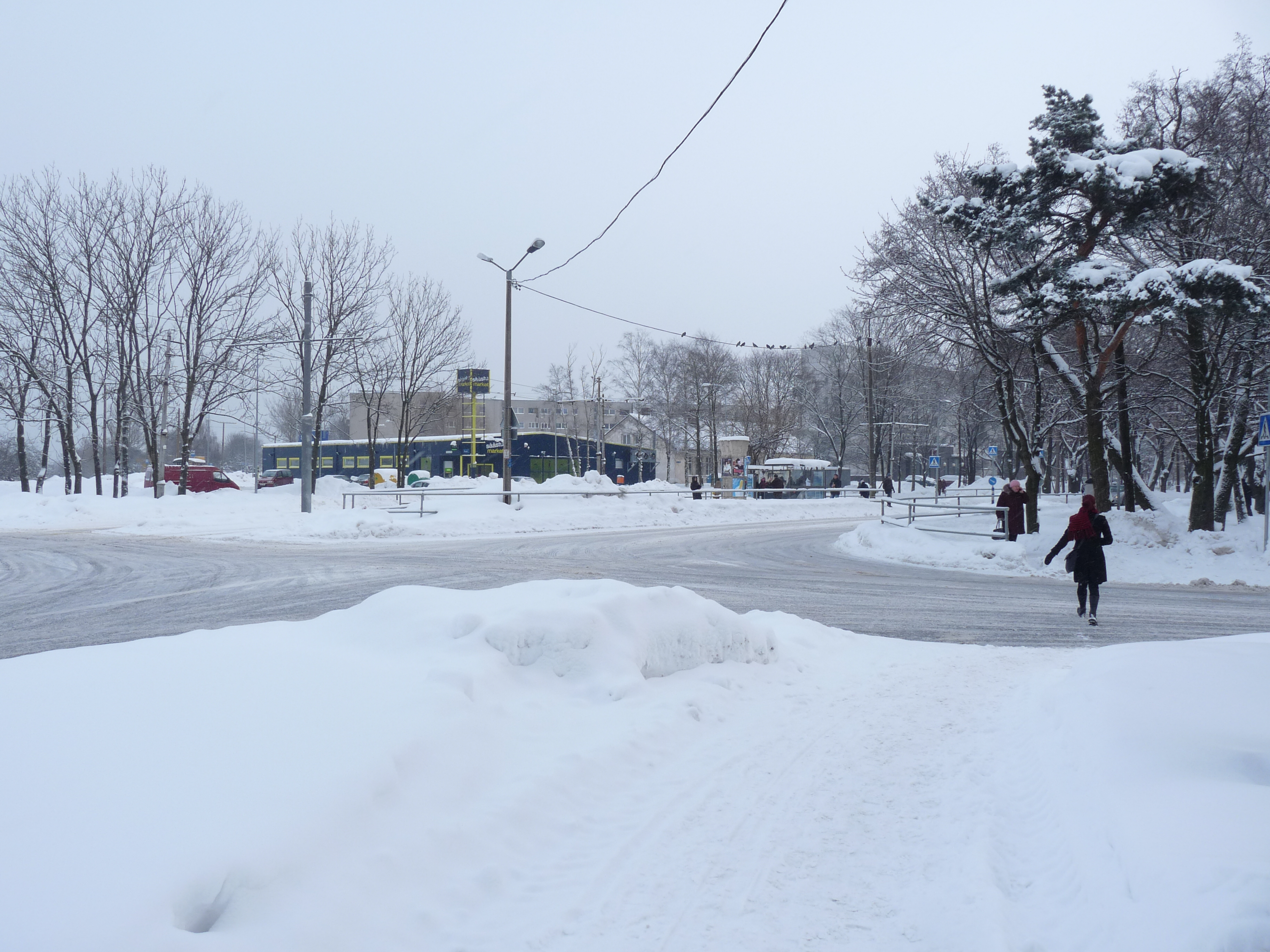
Sitsimägi (Chintz Hill)

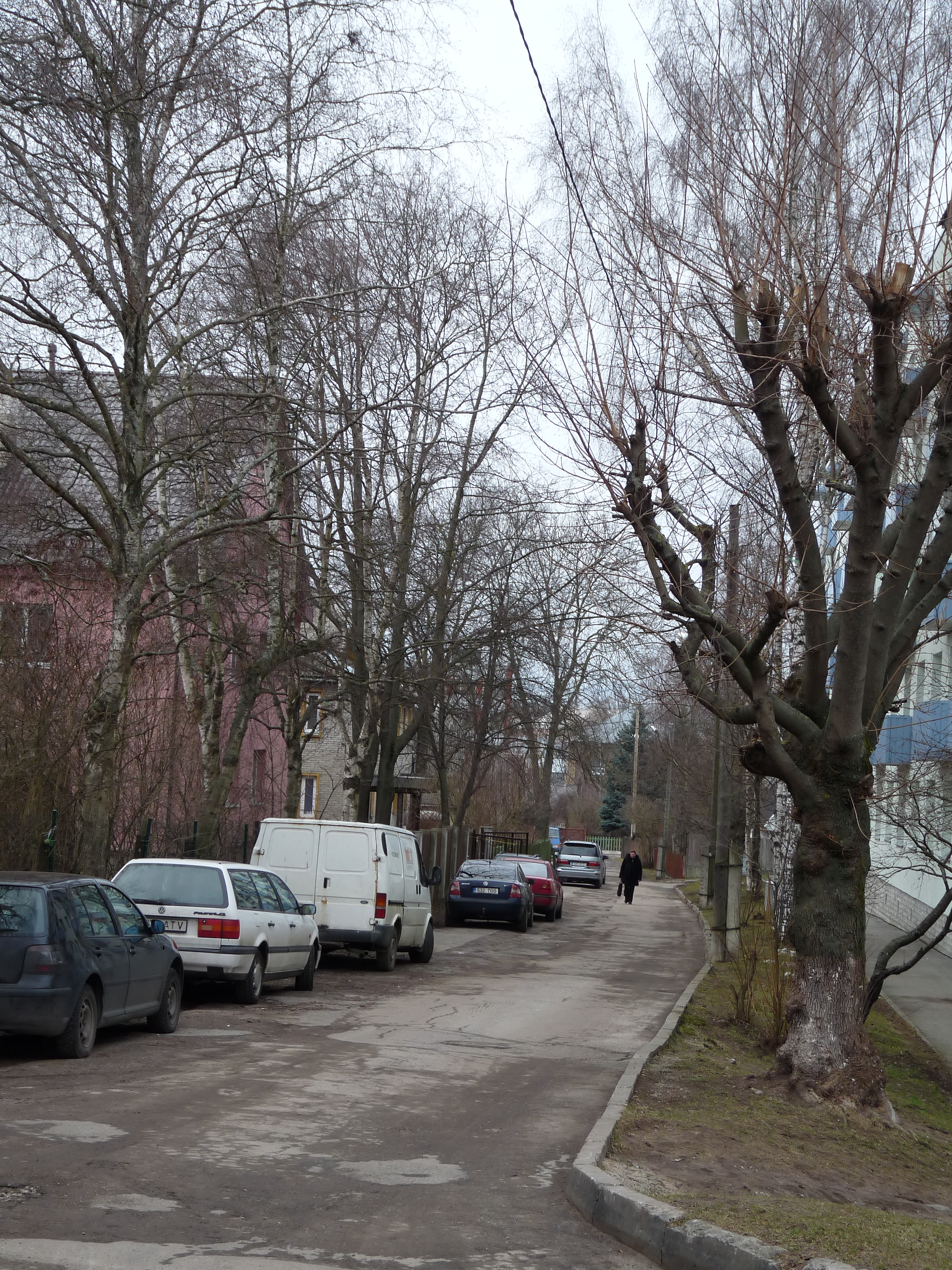
Kanepi Street
