= Harju (surname) =

Harju is a Finnish surname. Notable people with the surname include:

- Arsi Harju (born 1974), Finnish shot putter
- Beata Harju (born 1990), Finnish voice actress
- Chris Harju (born 1957), American rugby union player
- Johan Harju (born 1986), Swedish ice hockey player
- Jori Harju (born 1964), Finnish admiral
- Juha Harju (born 1981), Finnish heavy metal musician
- Matti Harju (born 1943), Finnish ice hockey player
- Mirella Harju (born 1982), Finnish racing cyclist
- Venla Harju (born 1990), Finnish orienteer
