= Harju Elu =

Estonian newspaper

- Type: Weekly newspaper
- Owner: Ülo Russak
- Publisher: OÜ Harel
- Founded: 1944
- Language: Estonian
- Circulation: 7,000 (as of February 2024)
- Website: harjuelu.ee

Harju Elu is the official weekly newspaper of Harju County, Estonia.

== History and profile ==
The paper was founded in 1944. From 1993 to 2007 it carried the name of Harjumaa.
