= Põhja-Tallinn =

District of Tallinn

- District of Tallinn
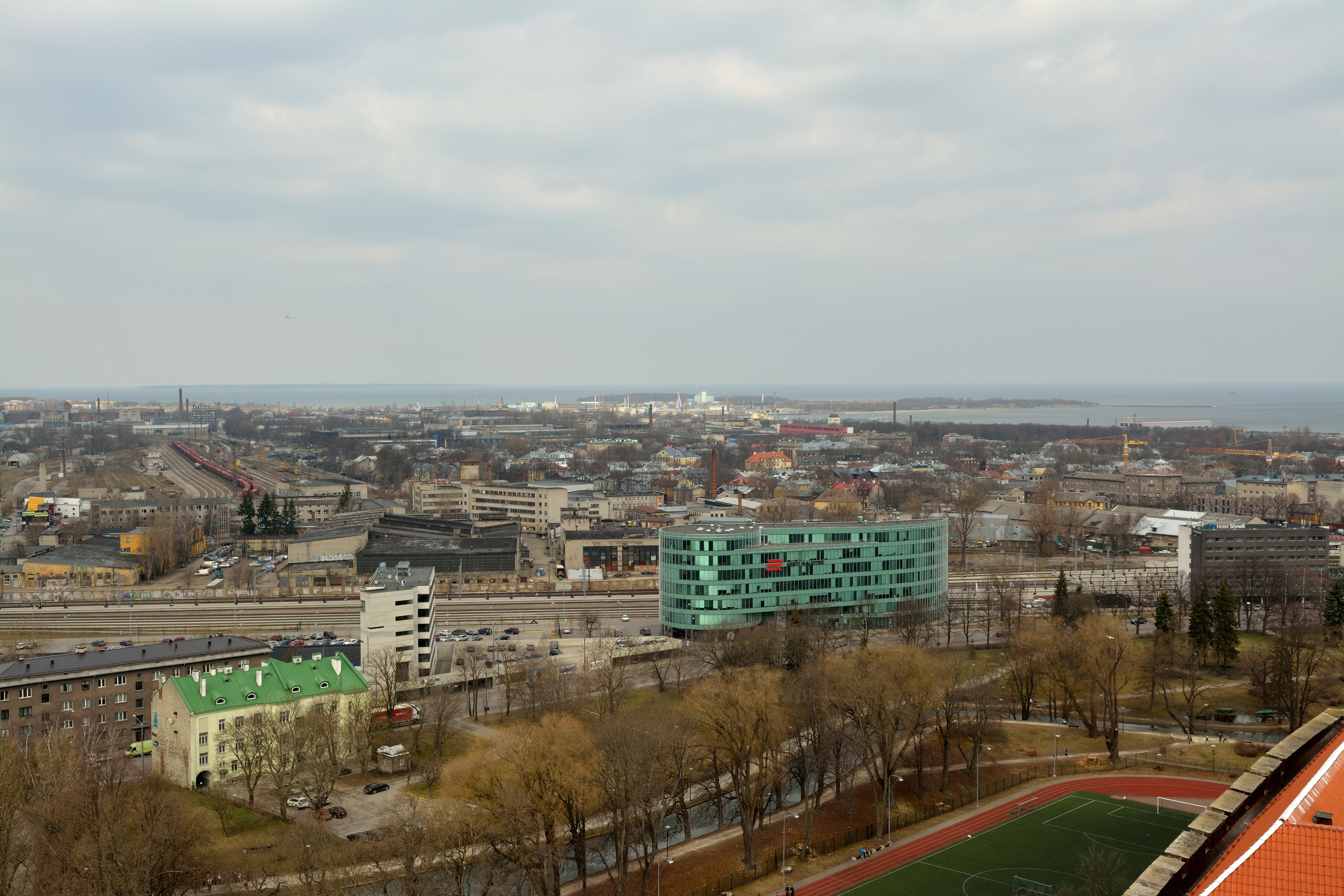
- Põhja-Tallinn from Pikk Hermann tower.

- Location of Põhja-Tallinn in Tallinn.
- Coordinates: 59°26′56″N 24°41′53″E
- Country: Estonia
- County: Harju County
- City: Tallinn

Government
  - District Elder: Manuela Pihlap

Area
  - Total: 15.22 km^{2} (5.88 sq mi)

Population (08.2026)
  - Total: 62 022
  - Density: 4.1/km^{2} (11/sq mi)
- Website: www.tallinn.ee/pohja

Põhja-Tallinn (Estonian for 'northern Tallinn') is one of the eight administrative districts (Estonian: linnaosa) of Tallinn, the capital of Estonia.

== Subdistricts ==
Põhja-Tallinn is divided into eight subdistricts (Estonian: asum): Kalamaja, Karjamaa, Kopli, Merimetsa, Paljassaare, Pelgulinn, Pelguranna, and Sitsi.

== Population ==
The population in Põhja-Tallinn was 62 022 as of August 2026.

Ethnic composition 1989-2021
Ethnicity	1989		2000		2011		2021	
Ethnicity	amount	%	amount	%	amount	%	amount	%
Estonians	27233	35.3	24667	43.4	26820	49.8	31997	53.0
Russians	38627	50.1	25921	45.6	22501	41.8	20702	34.3
Ukrainians	-	-	-	-	1811	3.36	2491	4.12
Belarusians	-	-	-	-	1017	1.89	897	1.48
Finns	-	-	-	-	255	0.47	514	0.85
Jews	-	-	-	-	146	0.27	180	0.30
Latvians	-	-	-	-	95	0.18	226	0.37
Germans	-	-	-	-	71	0.13	158	0.26
Tatars	-	-	-	-	158	0.29	134	0.22
Poles	-	-	-	-	96	0.18	141	0.23
Lithuanians	-	-	-	-	111	0.21	164	0.27
unknown	1	0.00	474	0.83	104	0.19	480	0.79
other	11271	14.6	5747	10.1	696	1.29	2322	3.84
Total	77132	100	56809	100	53881	100	60406	100

== Gallery ==
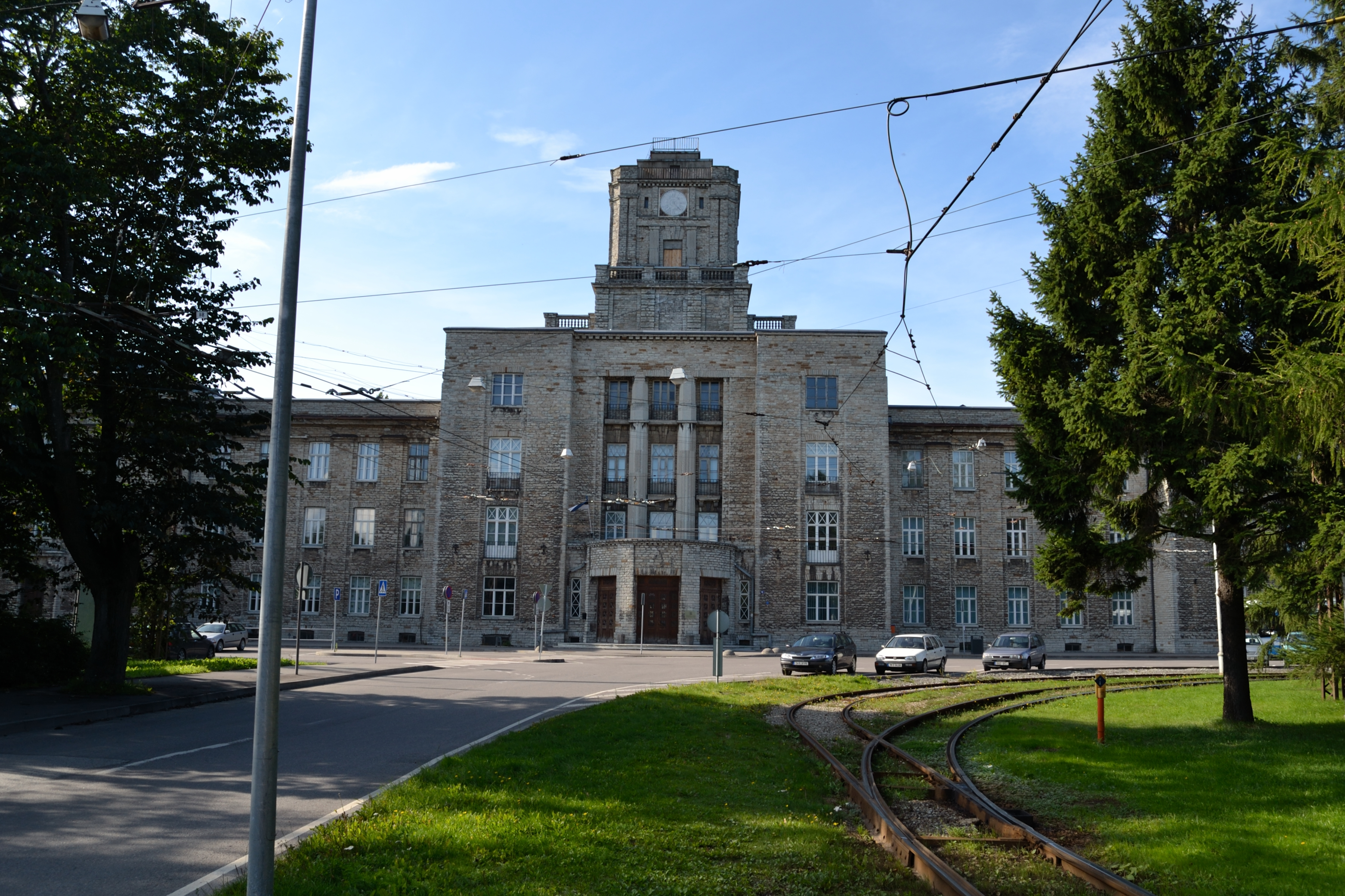
Former administrative building of Russo-Baltic shipyard in Kopli, now used by the Estonian Maritime Academy.

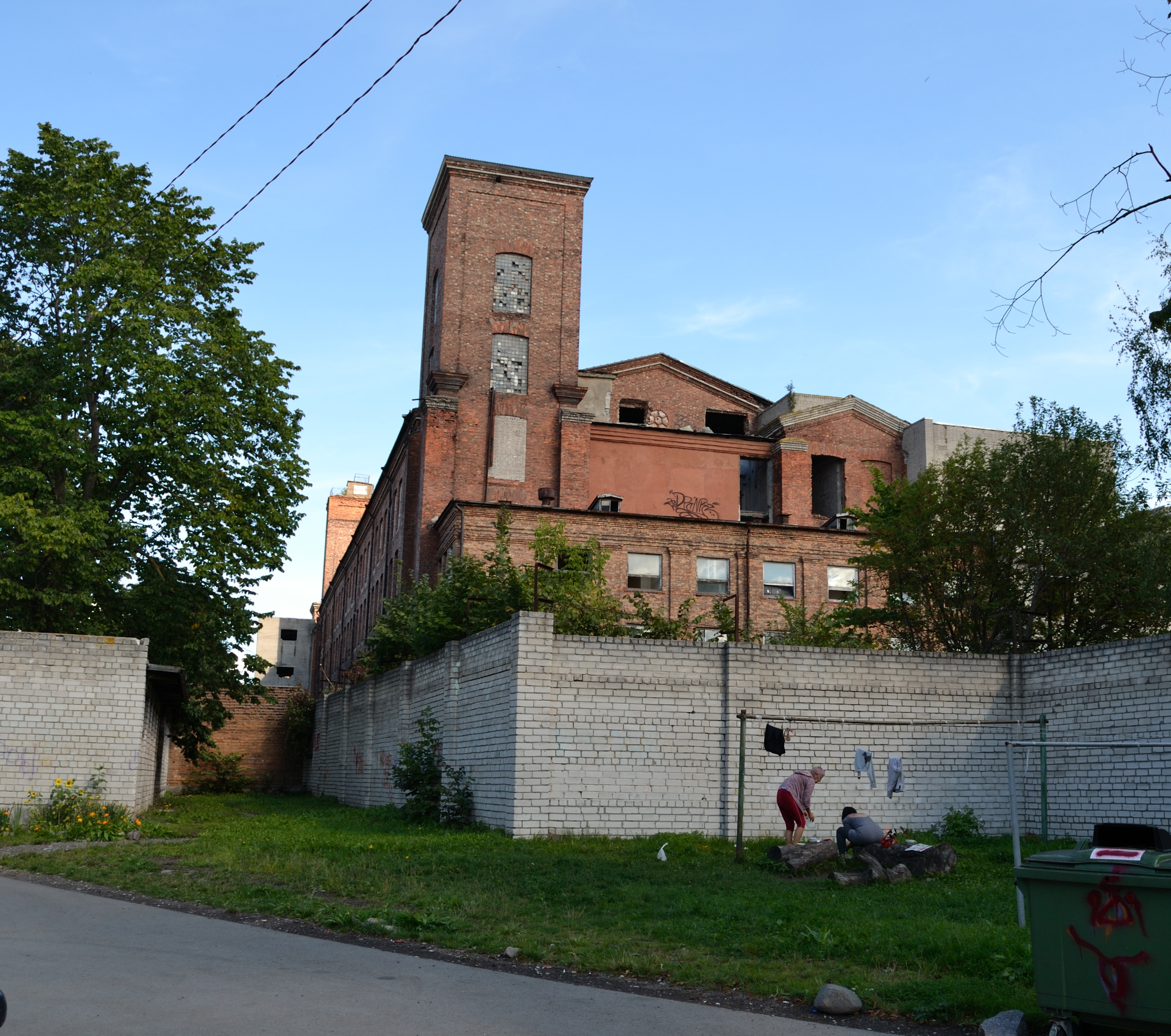
Former Baltic cotton factory building in Sitsi.

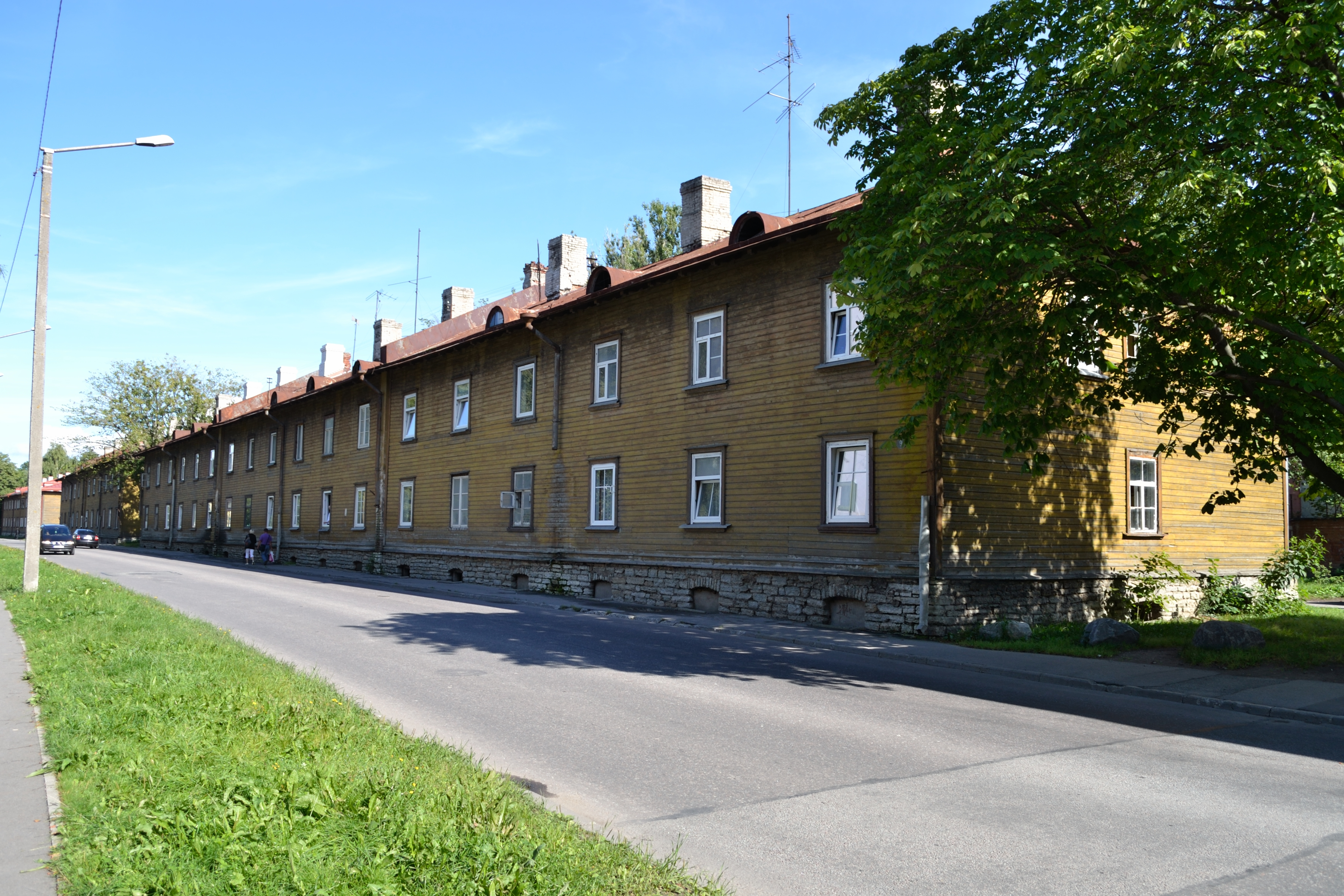
Dwelling of the workers of Baltic cotton factory.

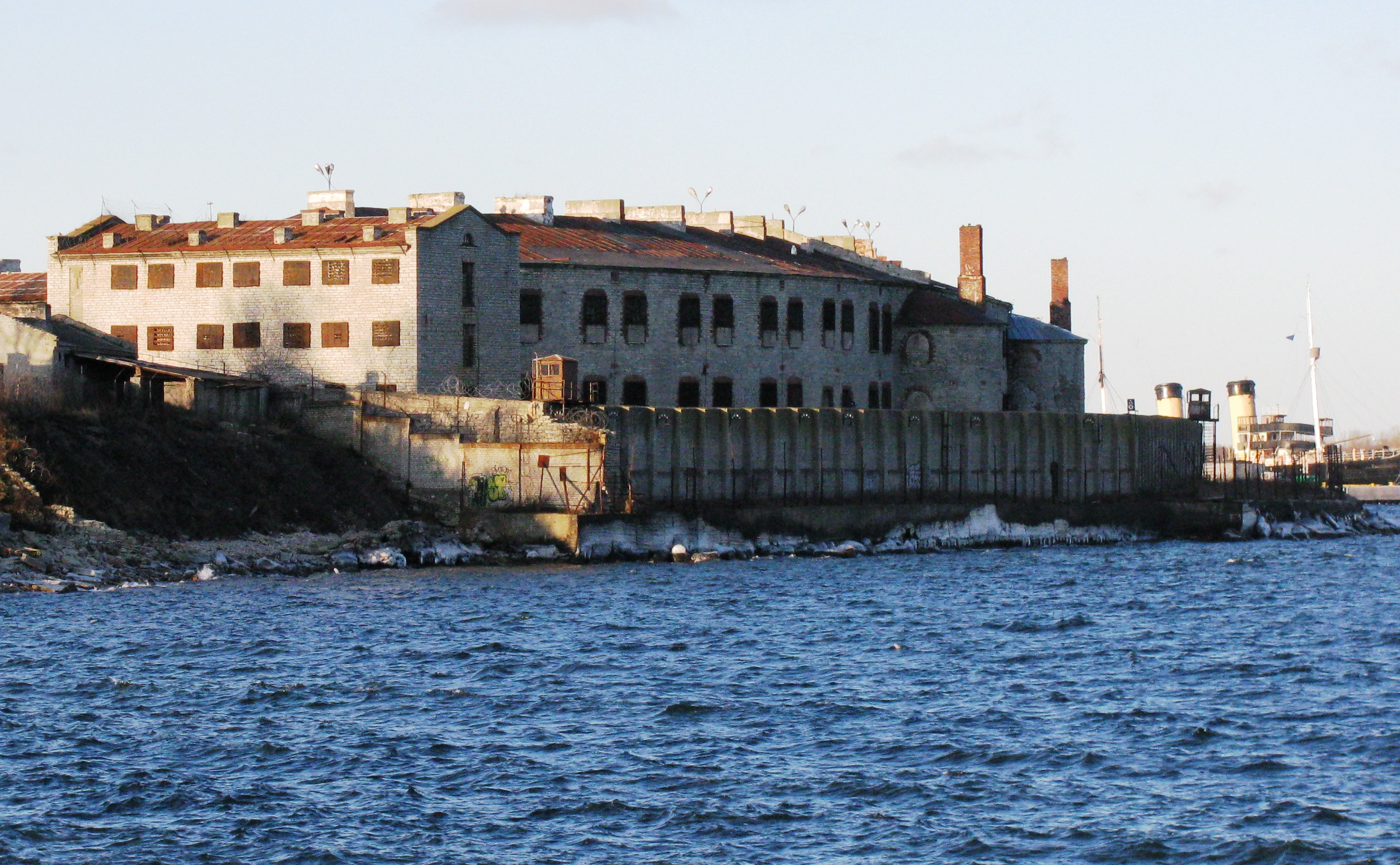
Former Patarei Prison in Kalamaja.

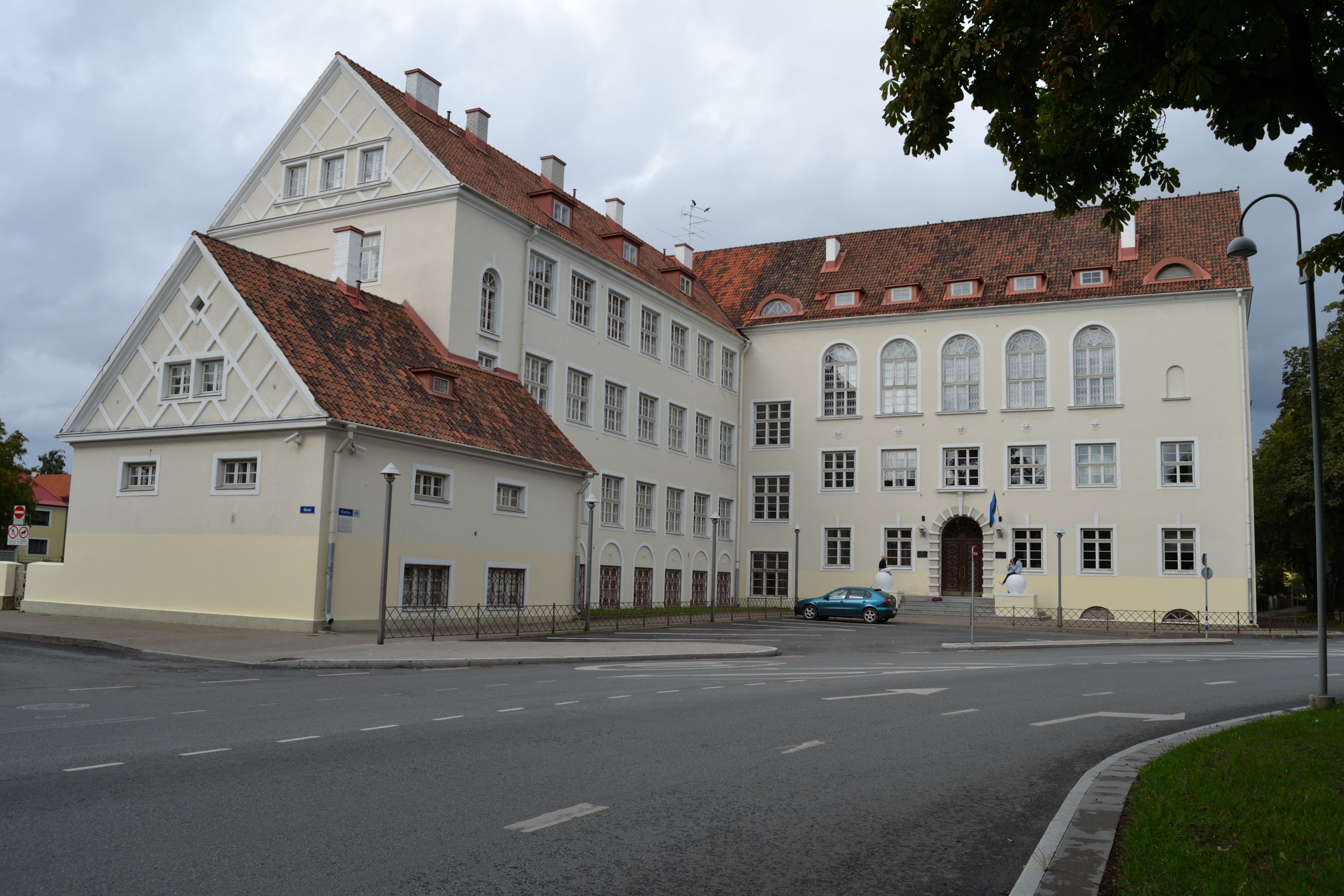
Schoolhouse in Pelgulinn.

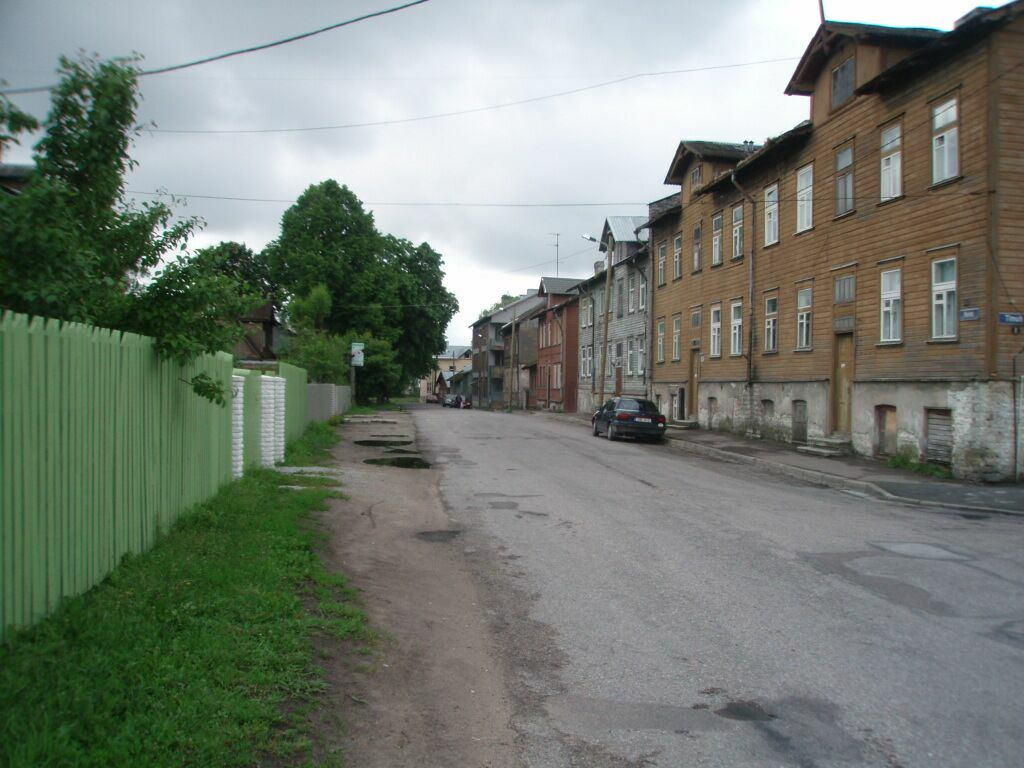
Wooden apartment buildings in Pelgulinn.

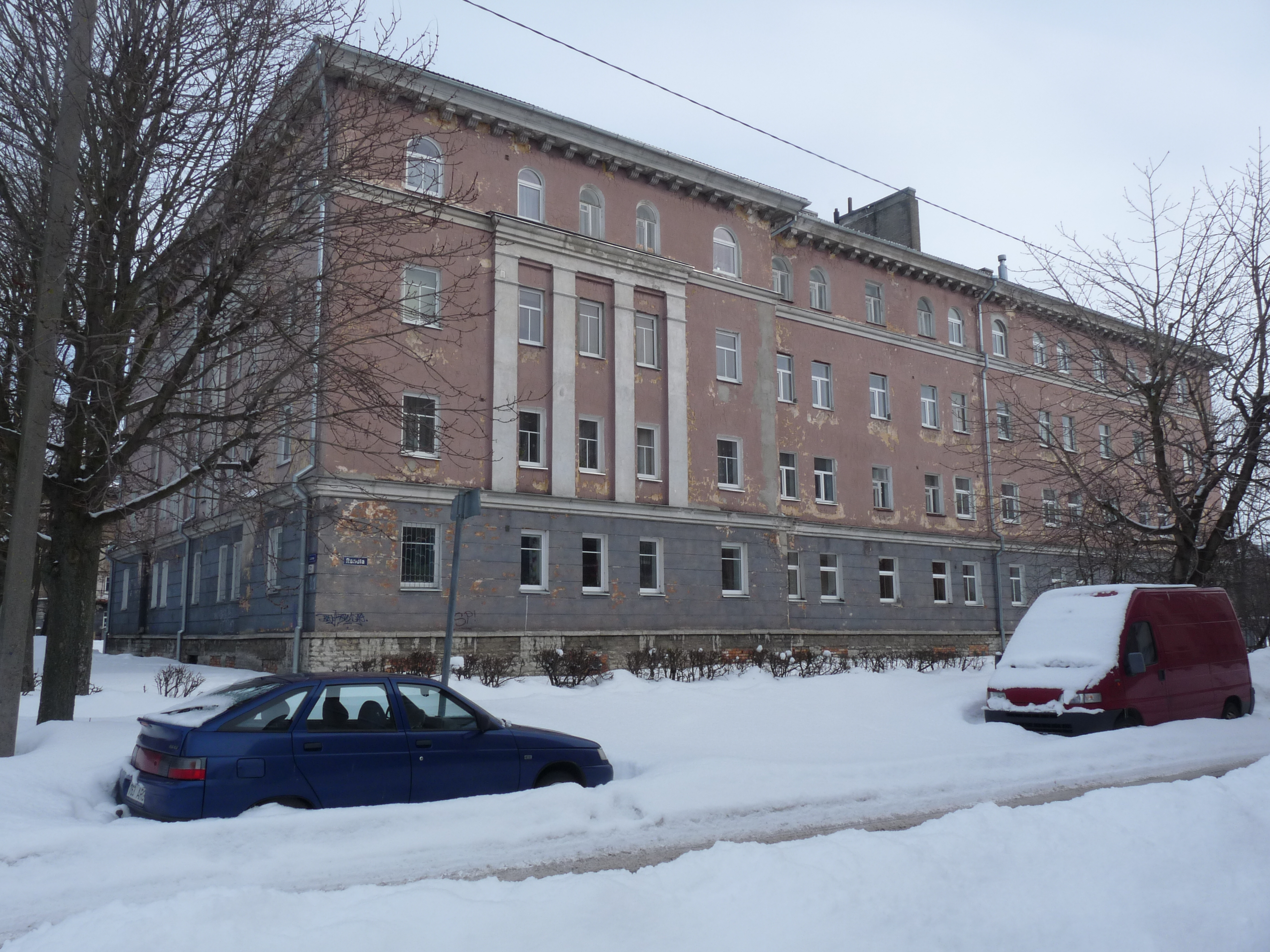
Stalin-era apartment building in Pelguranna.

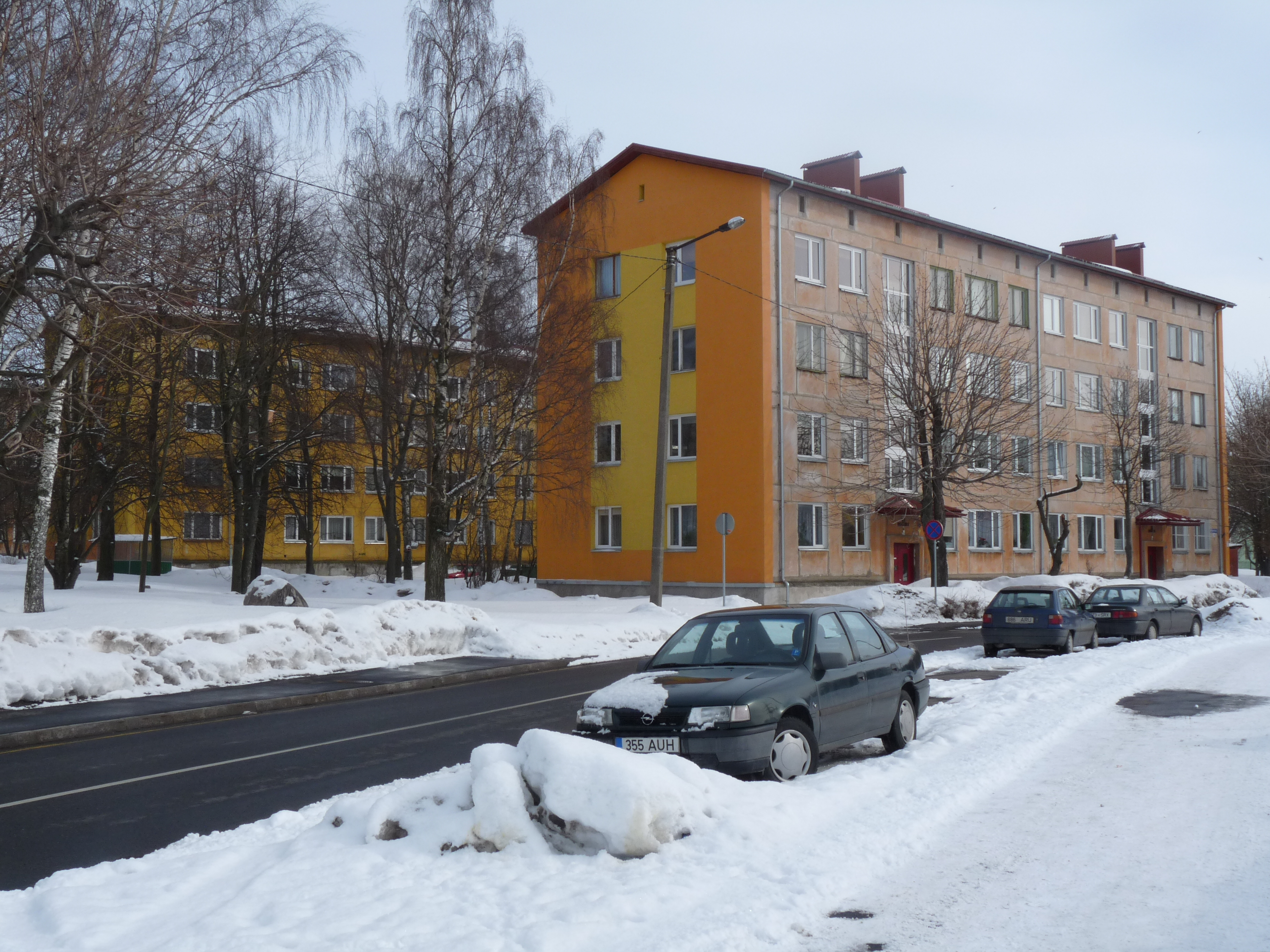
Typical Khrushchyovkas in Pelguranna.

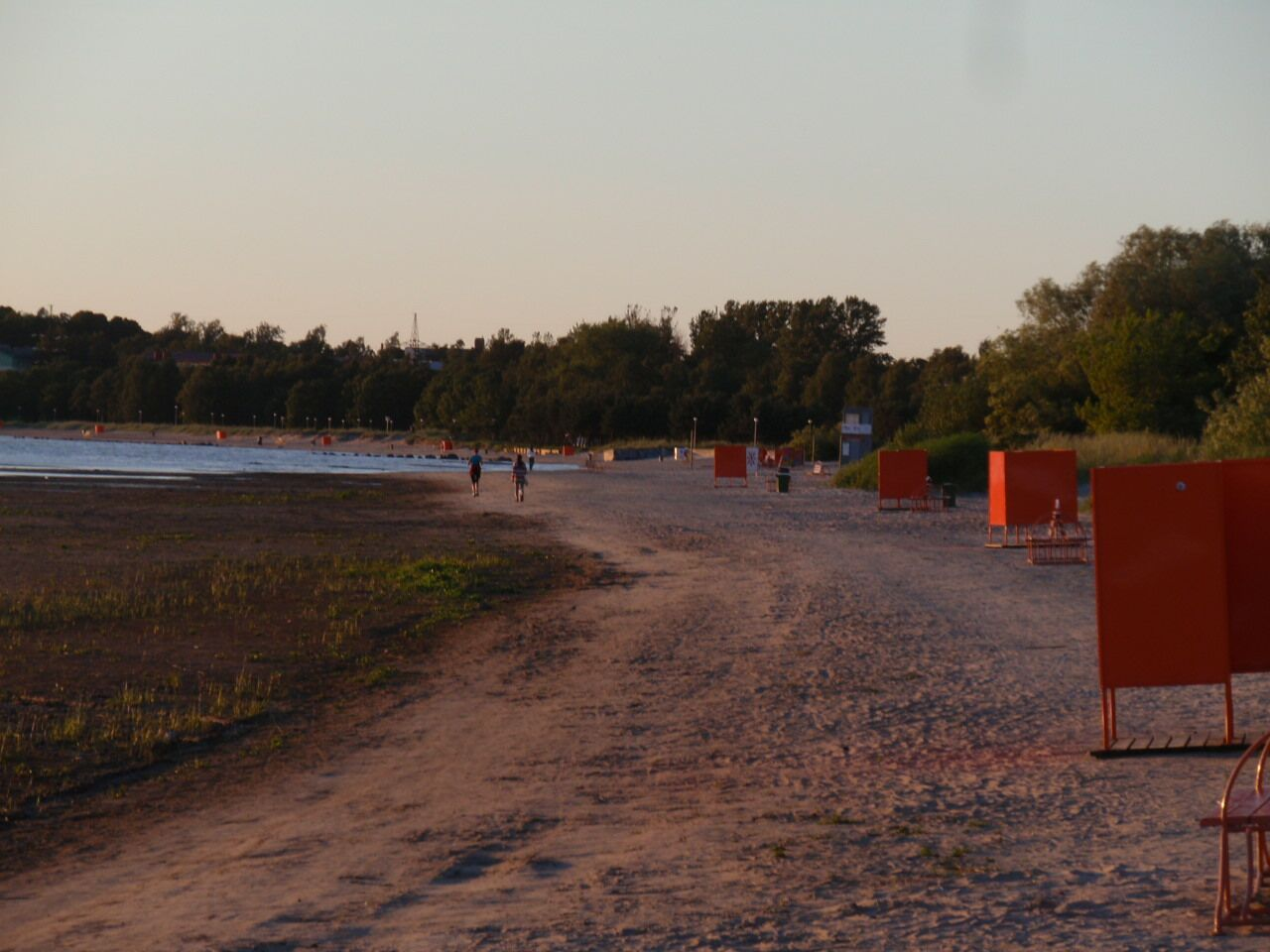
Stroomi Beach

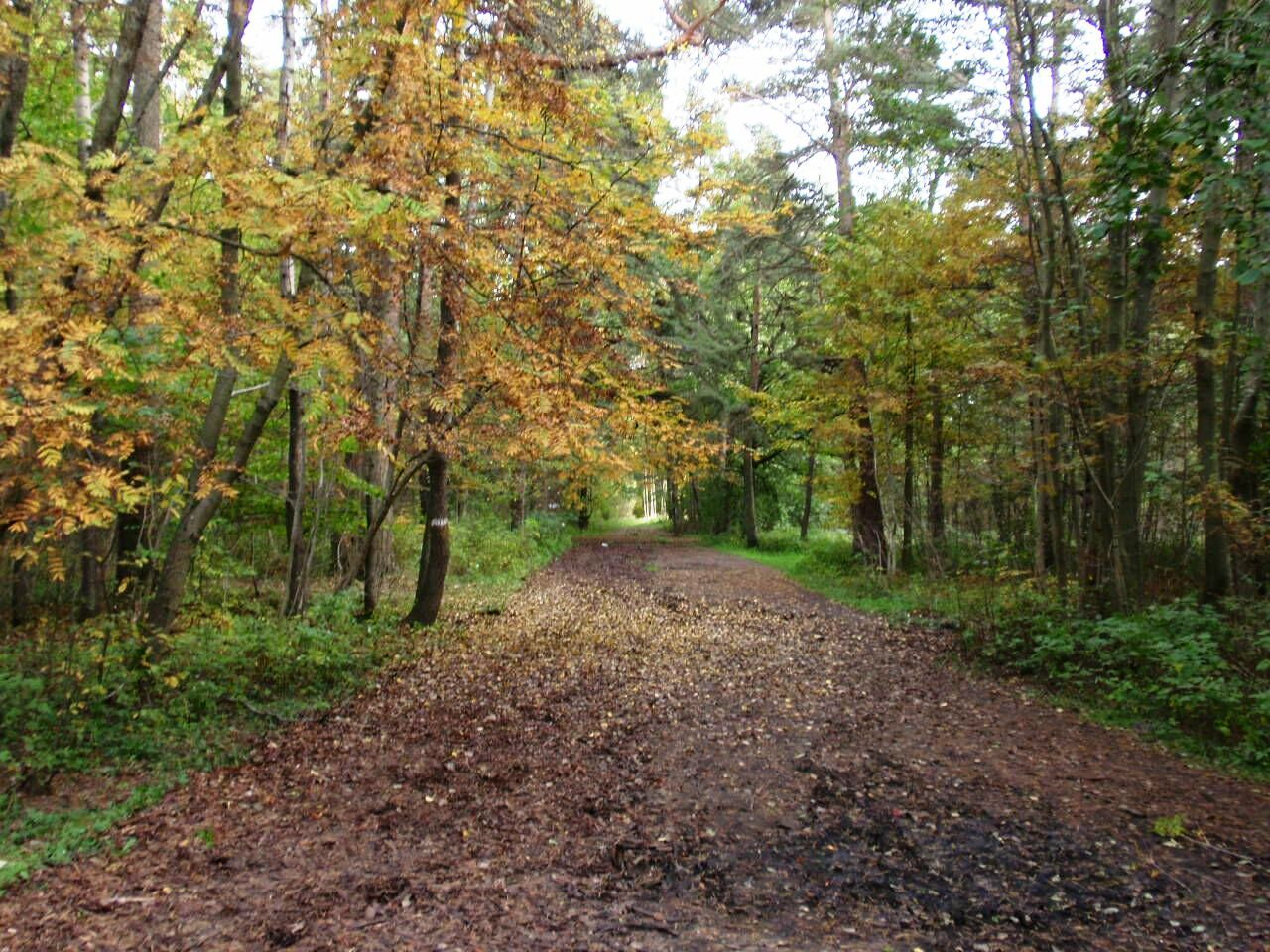
Merimetsa park-forest

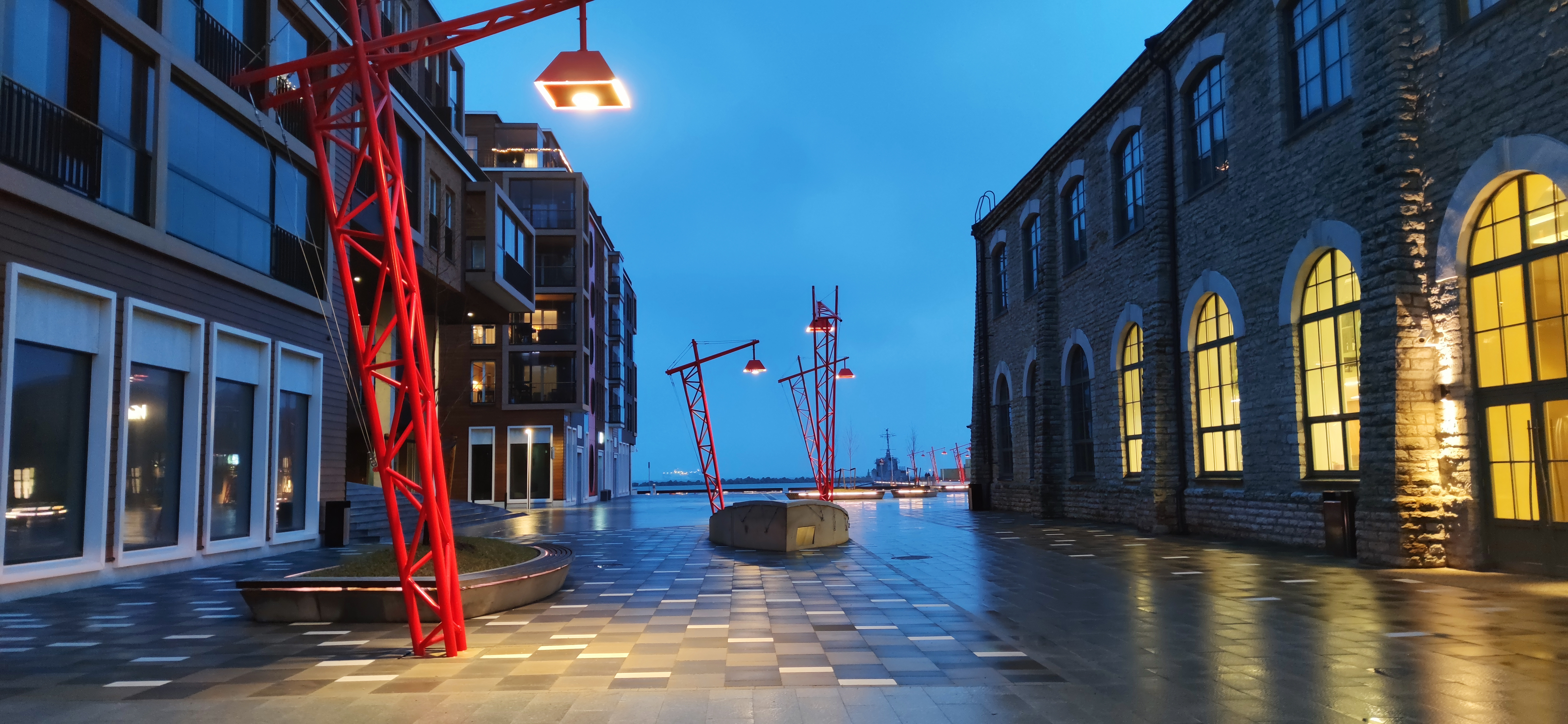
New residential sub-district at Noblessner port. Noblessner

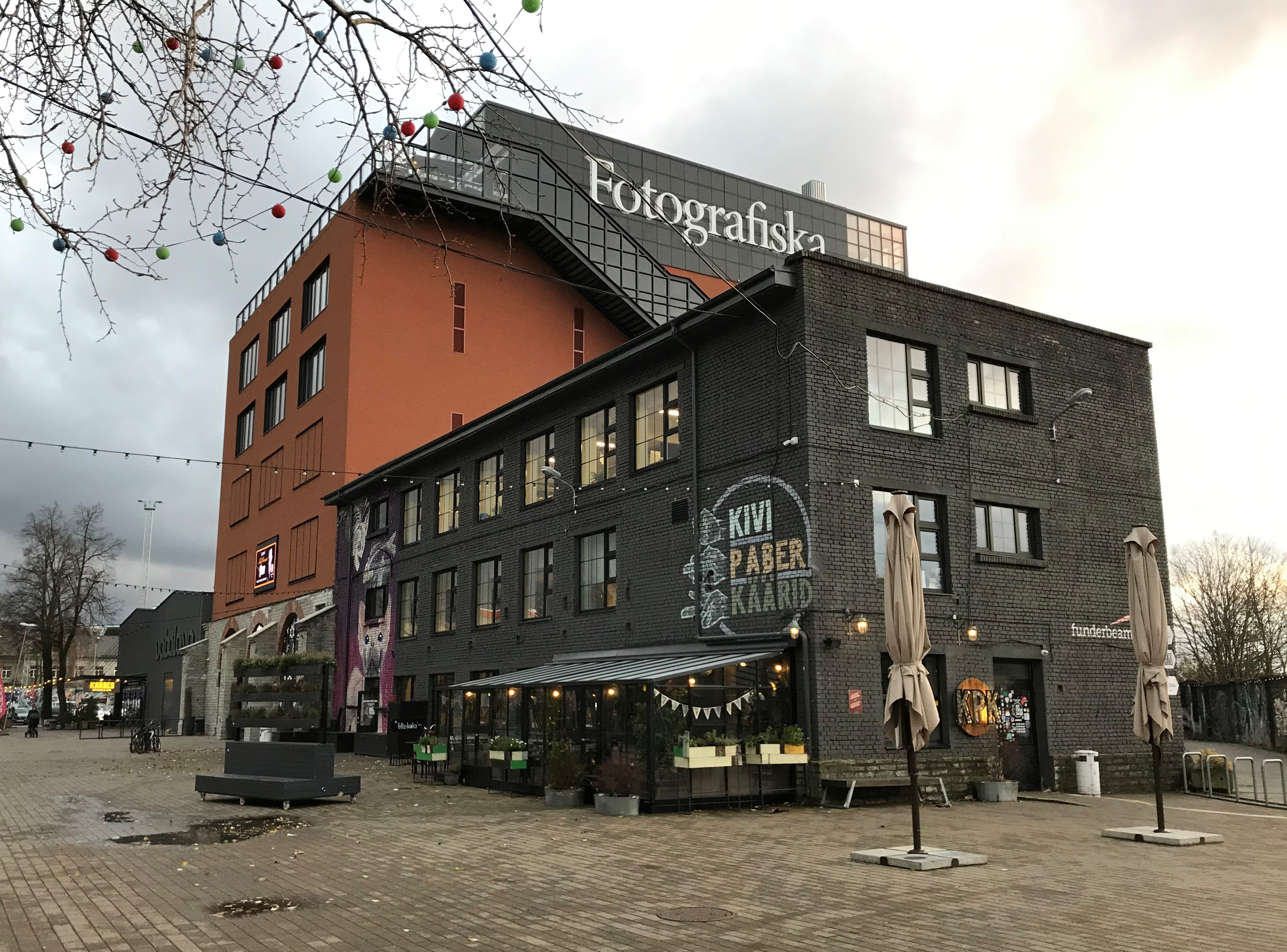
Fotografiska Tallinn, located in Telliskivi Creative City.
