= Merimetsa =

Subdistrict of Tallinn, Estonia

Coordinates: 59.435349°N 24.693457°E

- Subdistrict of Tallinn
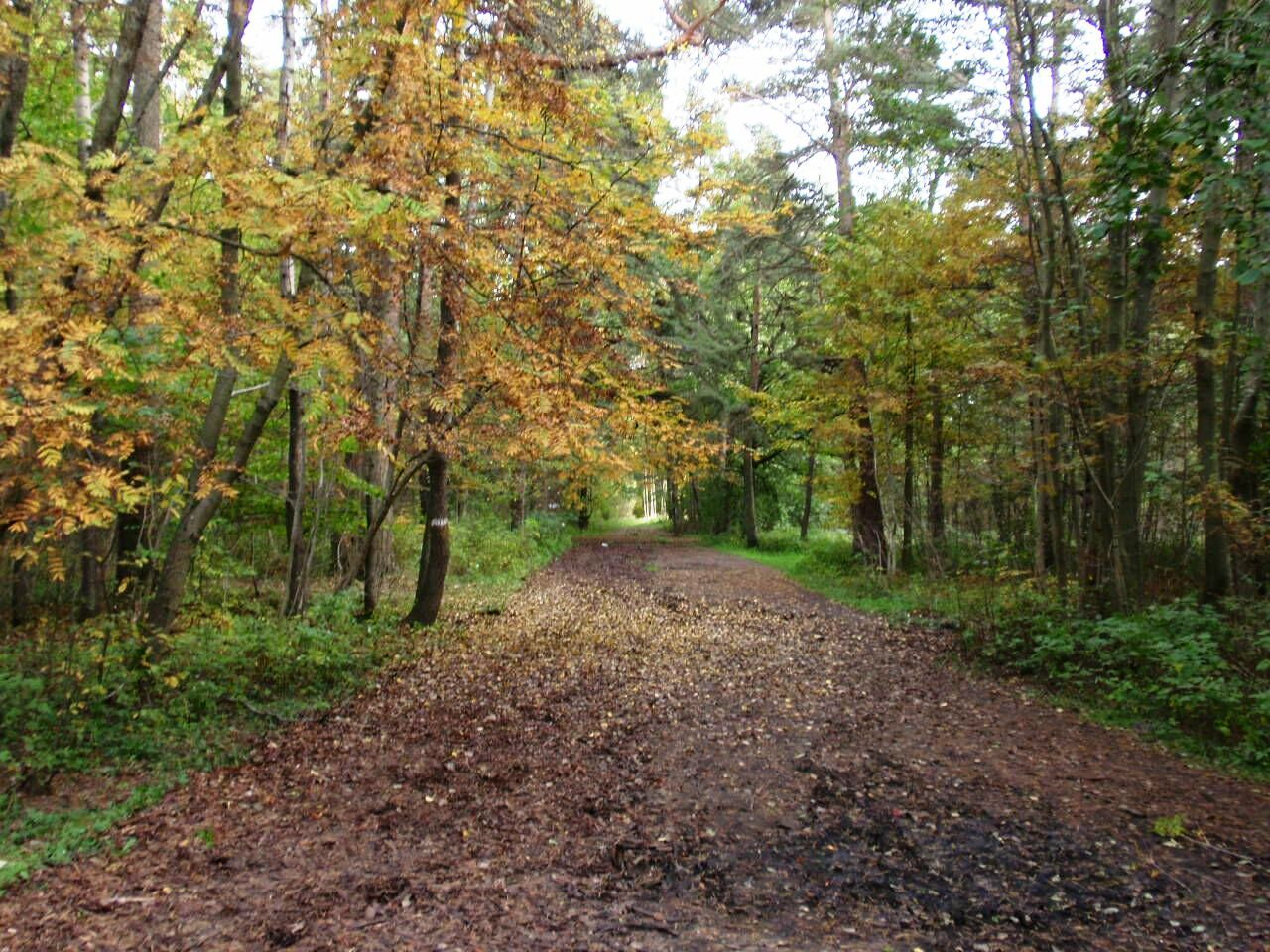
- The mixed forest of Merimetsa.

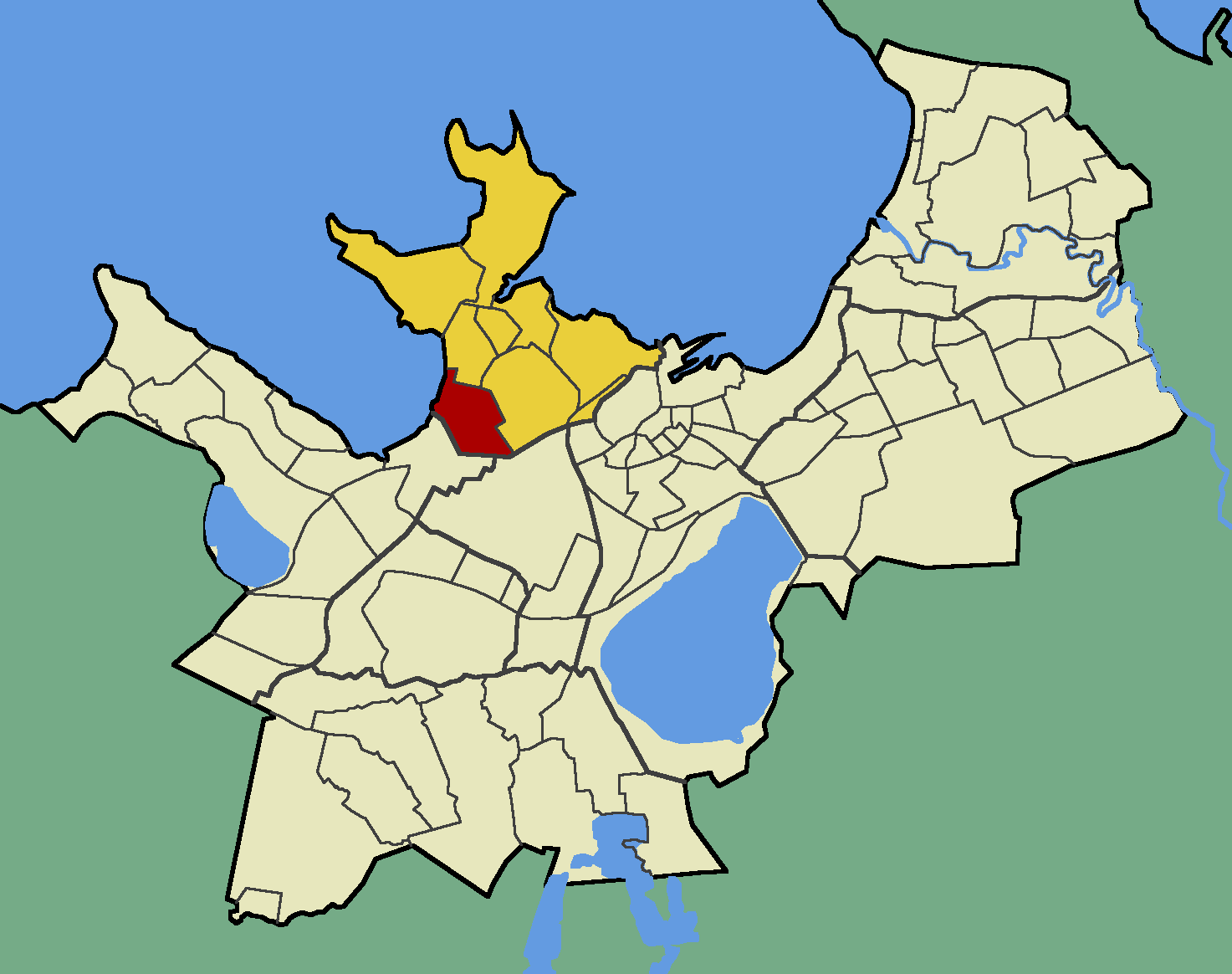
- Merimetsa within Põhja-Tallinn.
- Country: Estonia
- County: Harju County
- City: Tallinn
- District: Põhja-Tallinn

Population (01.01.2025)
  - Total: 5

Merimetsa (Estonian for "Sea Forest") is a subdistrict (Estonian: asum) in the district of Põhja-Tallinn, Tallinn, the capital of Estonia. It is mostly covered by the park forest Merimets (Sea Forest (German: Seewald); also known as Stroomi Forest (Estonian: Stroomi mets), derived from the nearby Stroomi Beach). Merimetsa has a population of 5 (As of 1 January 2022).

== Gallery ==
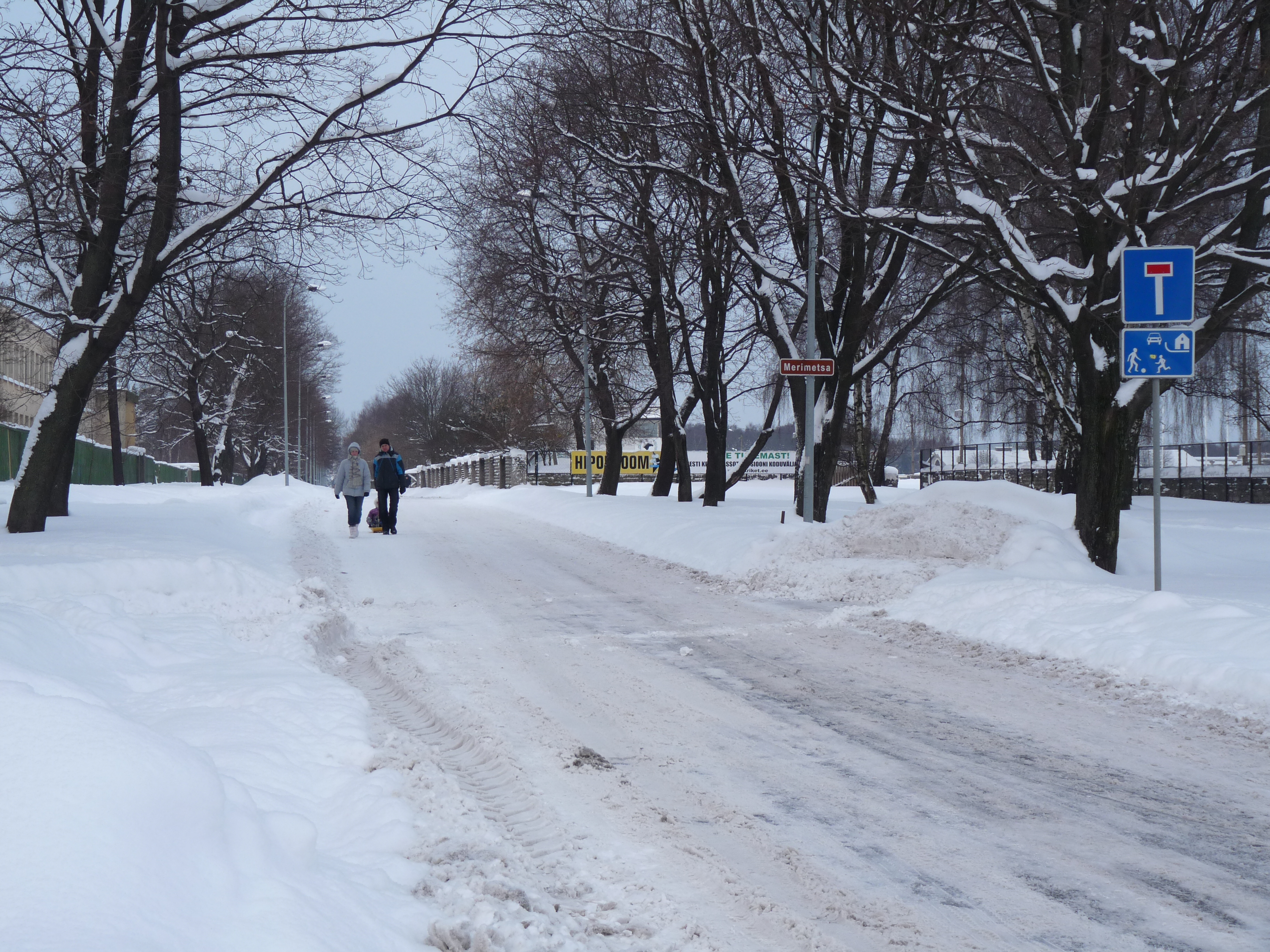
Beginning of Merimetsa street, between Tallinn Hippodrome and Tallinn Psychoneurology Hospital.

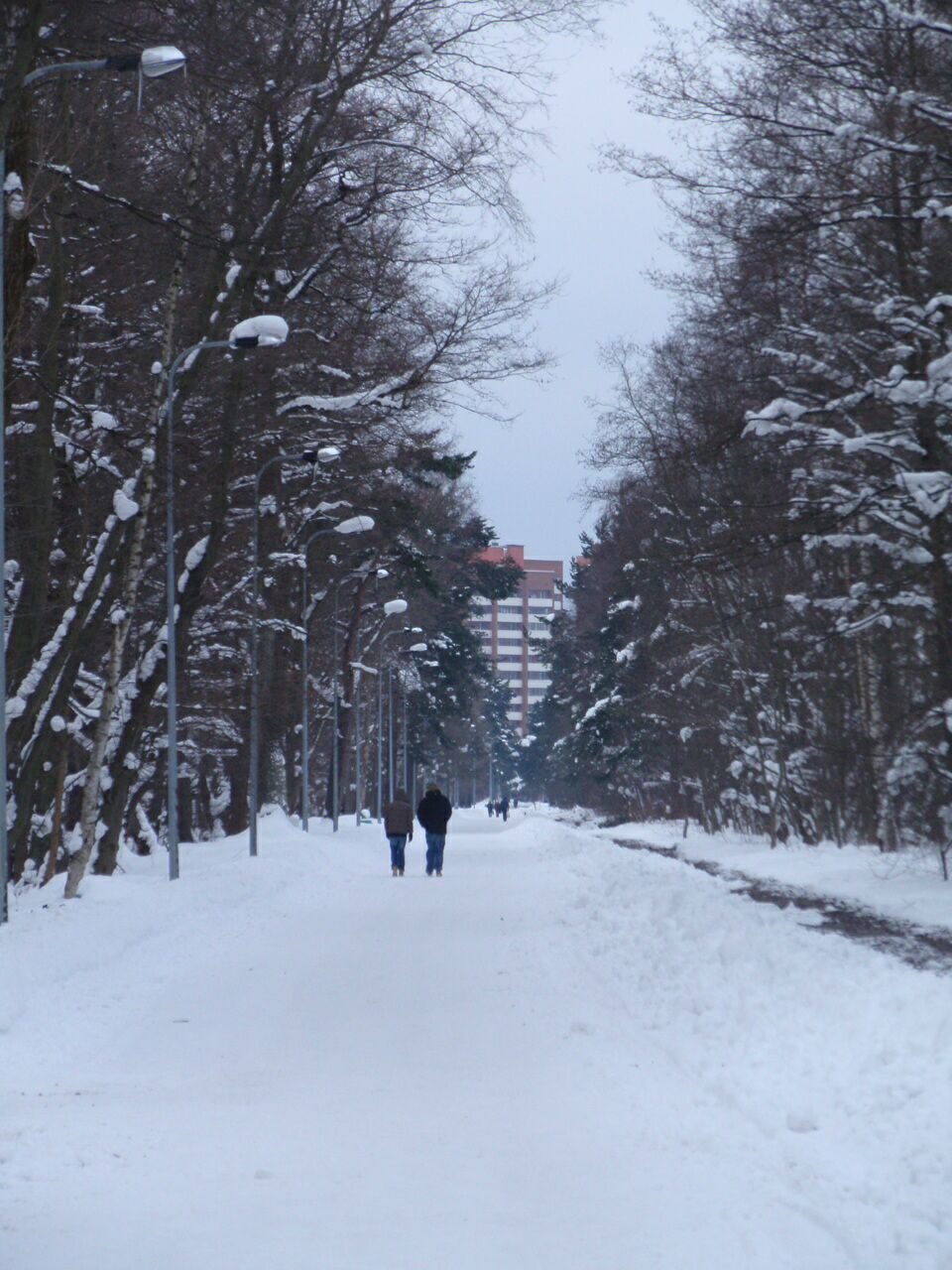

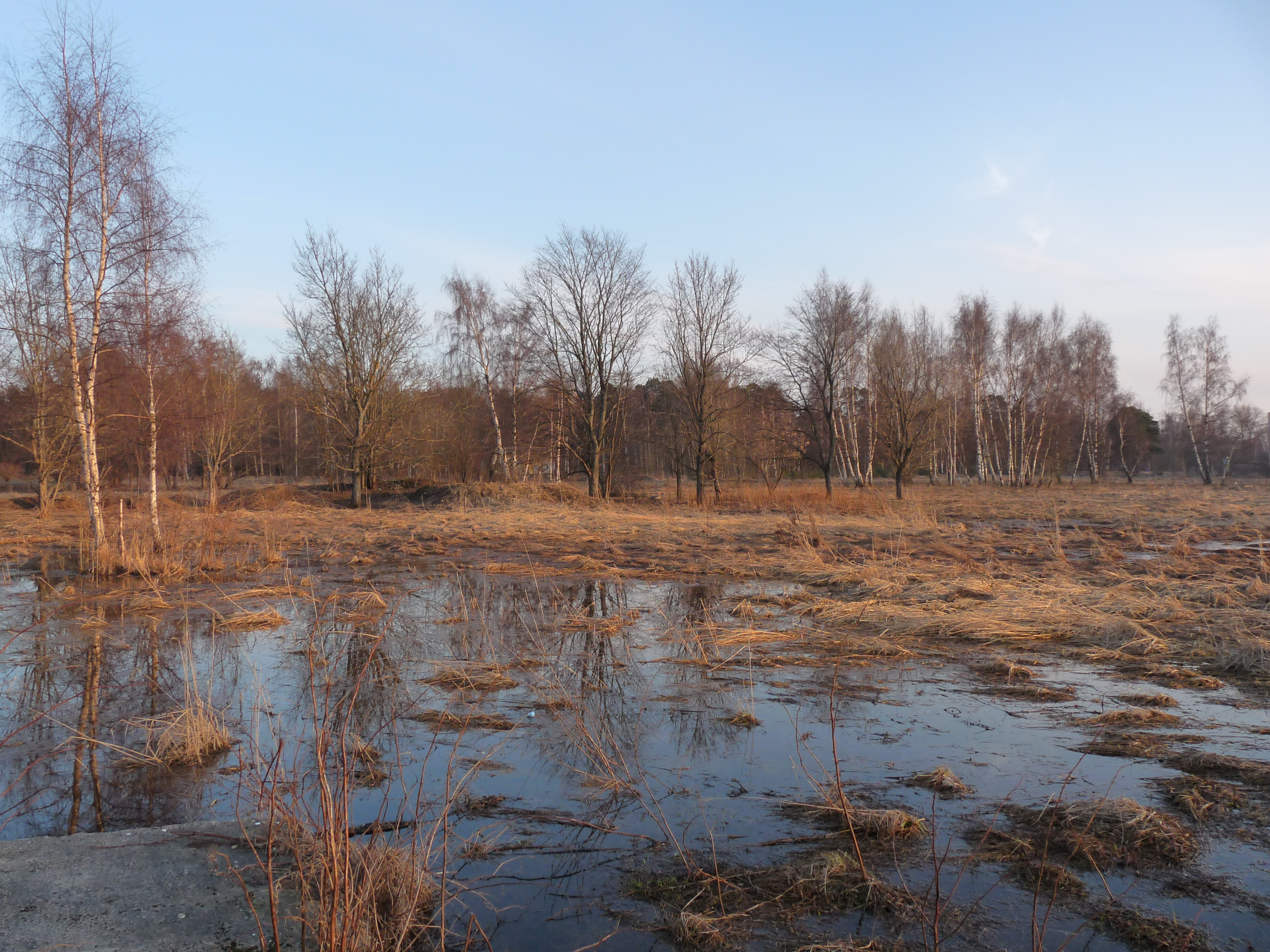
Wet period after the snowmelt.
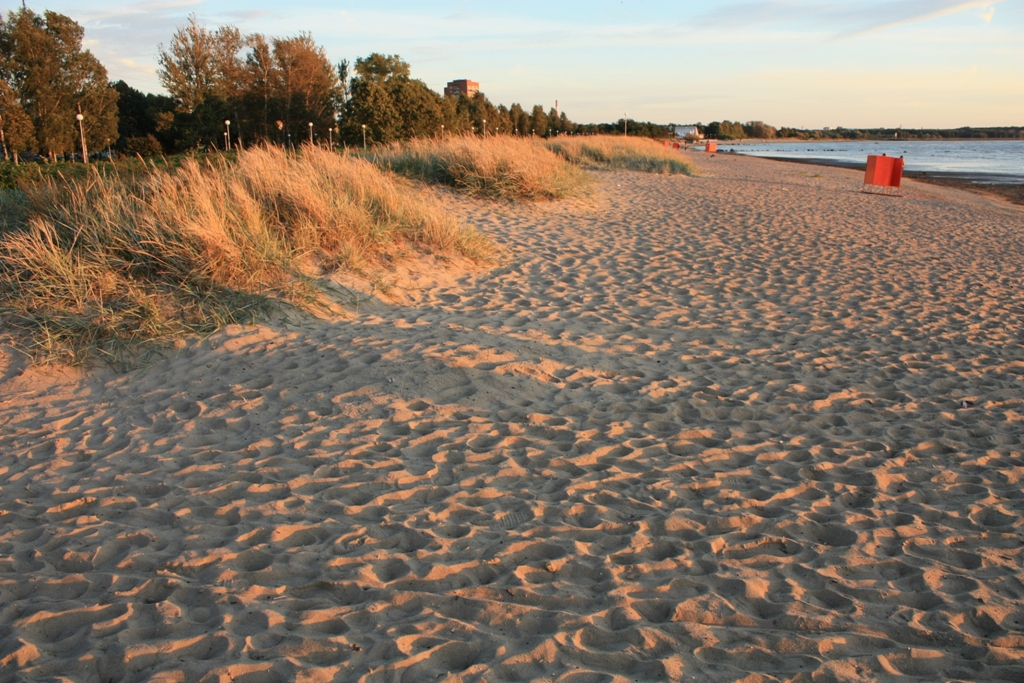
Stroomi beach

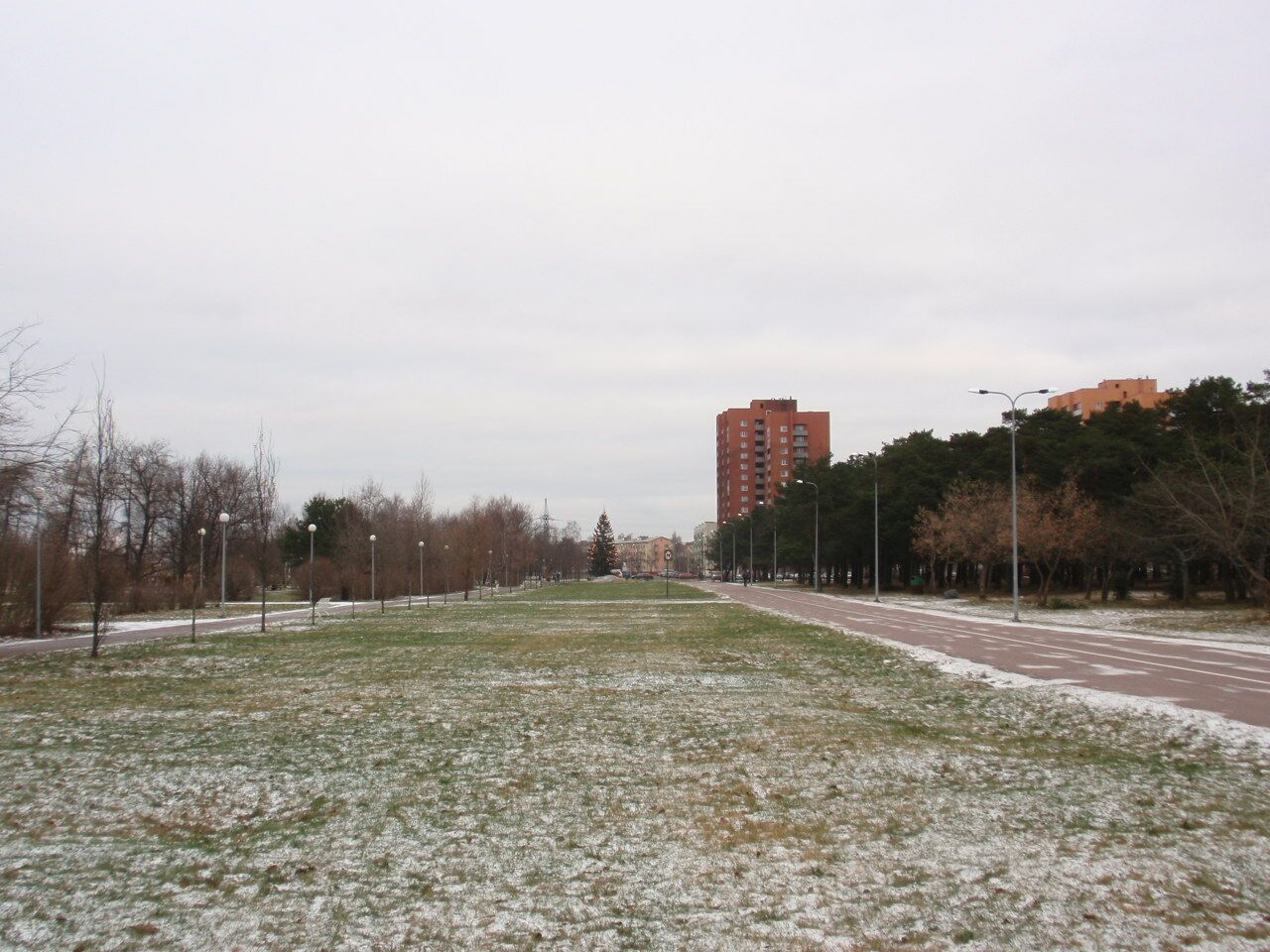
Stroomi beach park in Christmas.

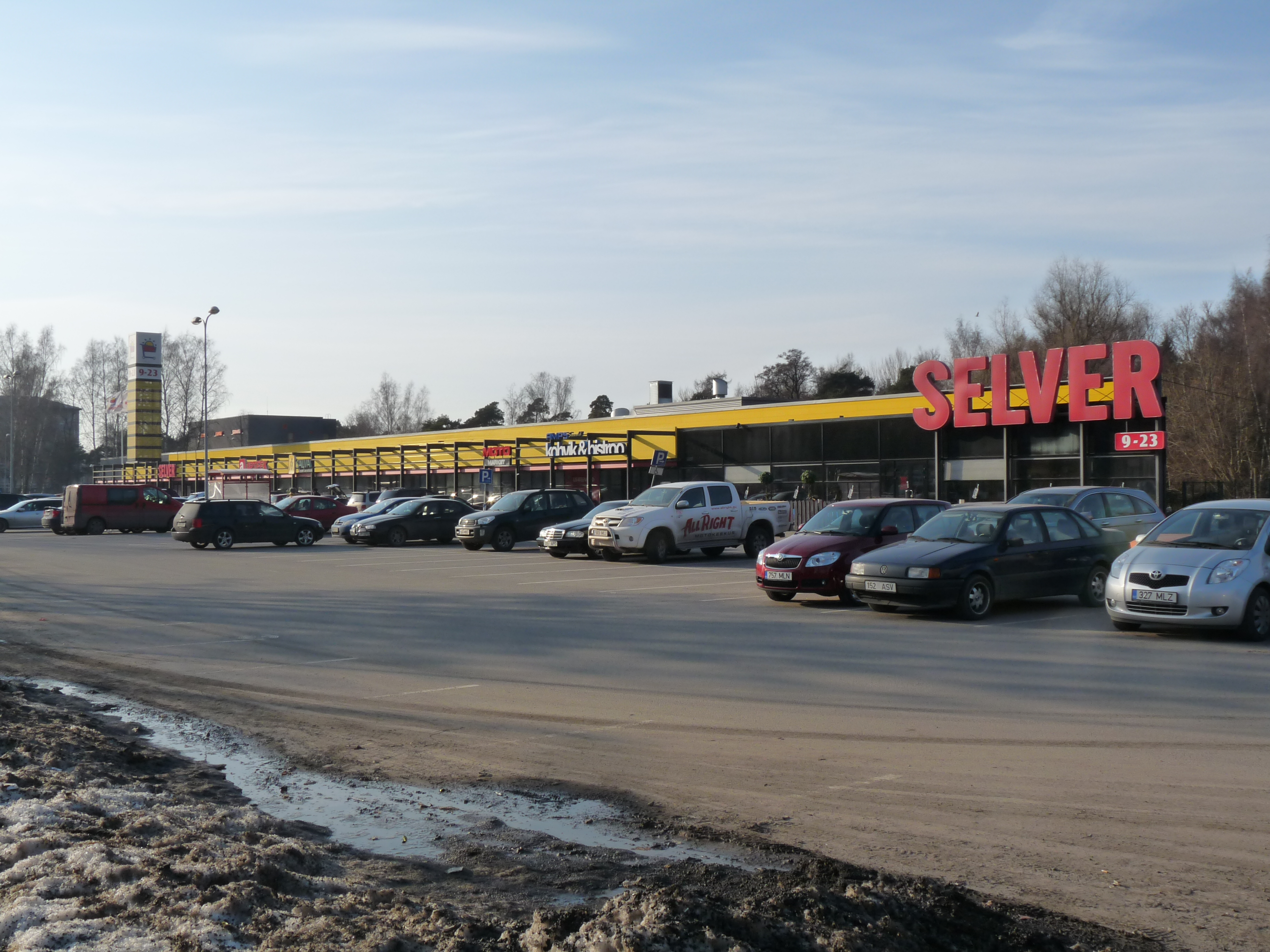
Merimetsa Selver, a supermarket on the Paldiski road.
