= Telliskivi Creative City =

Creative center in Tallinn, Estonia

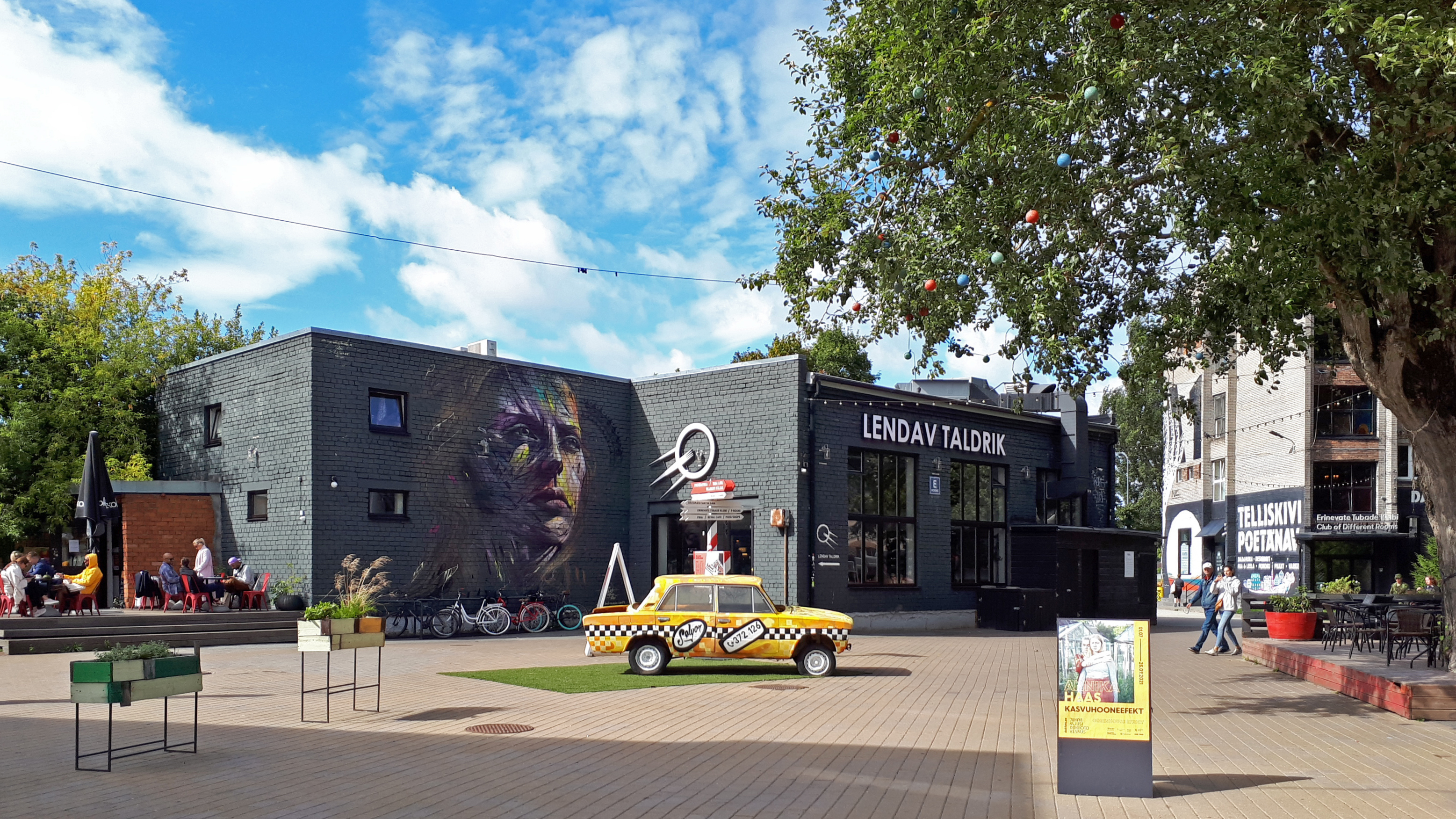
Telliskivi Creative City

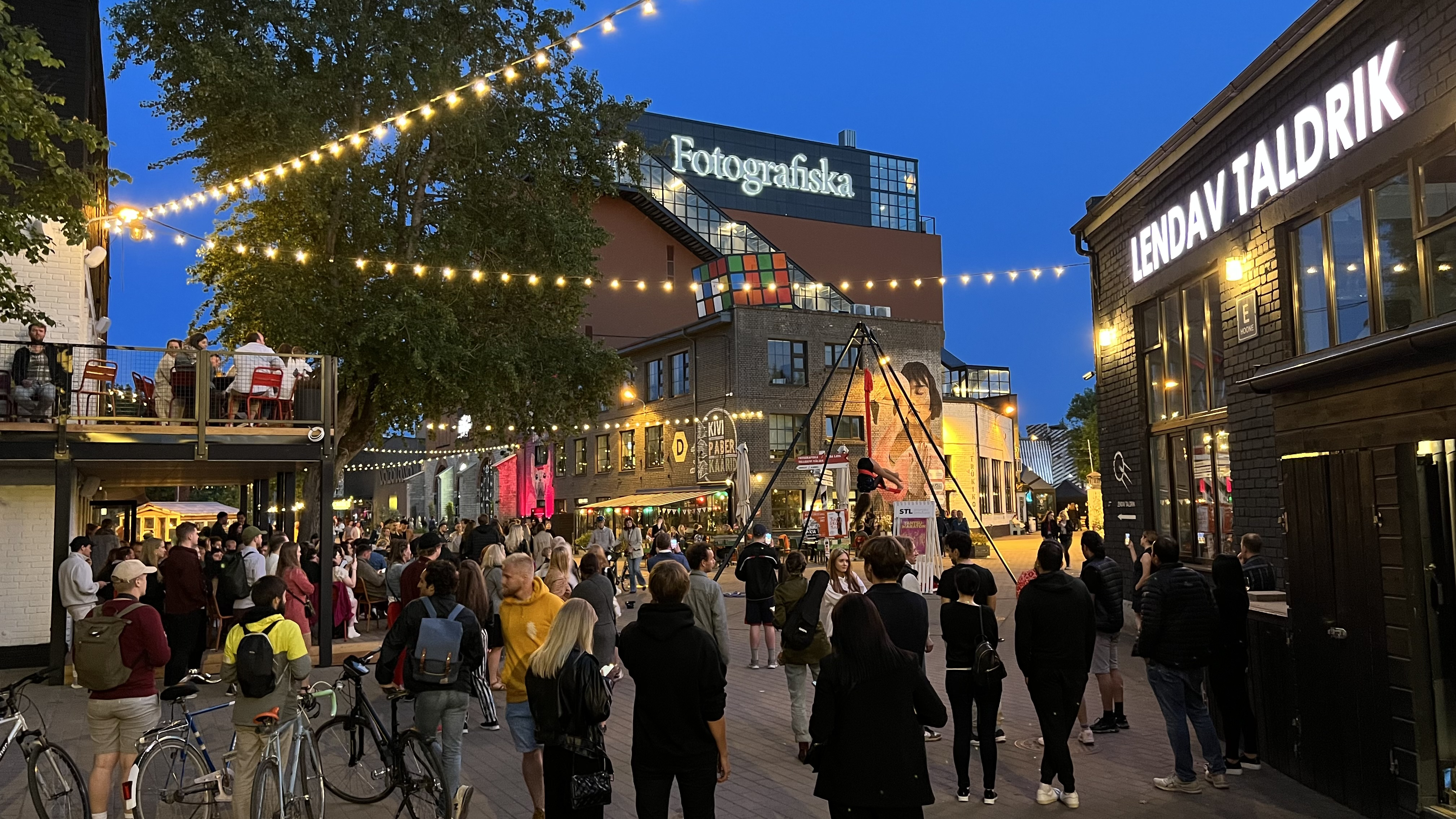
Evening at Telliskivi Creative City

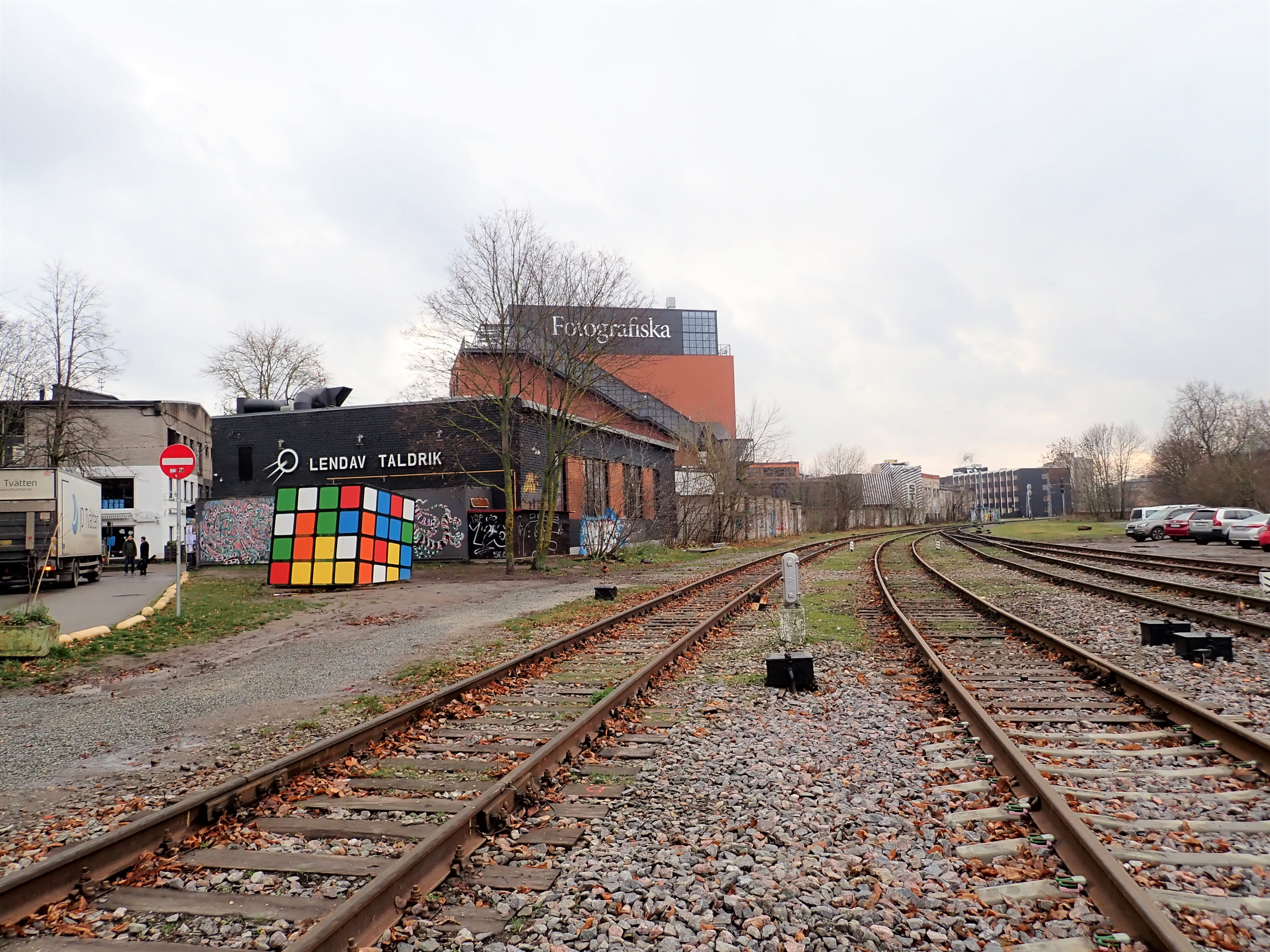
View to Telliskivi Creative City

Telliskivi Creative City (Estonian: Telliskivi Loomelinnak) is creative center located on Telliskivi Street in the Põhja-Tallinn district of Tallinn, Estonia. The center serves as a platform for the Estonian creative community and is situated on the former site of the Baltic Railway Company factory.

Telliskivi Creative City (Loomelinnak) was founded by Jaanus Juss in 2007. In 2009, the first tenant (the headquarters of Tallinn Black Nights Film Festival) moved in. Subsequently, the weekly flea market, and a skate park called Haigla ('Hospital') was opened.

Nowadays, Telliskivi Creative City comprises 10 buildings with a total area of over 25,000 m^{2} (270,000 sq ft). It houses over 300 companies, 90% of which are creative enterprises, as well as nearly 30 shops and a dozen restaurants, two theaters, seven galleries and several conference and seminar rooms. The center hosts nearly a thousand cultural events annually, attended by almost a million people, including the "Ma ei saa aru" art festival, Jazzkaar, Tallinn Music Week, and many others.

Since 2019, the international photo art center Fotografiska Tallinn was opened, presenting the best works of top photographers with frequently changing exhibitions. Fotografiska also has a café and restaurant that can be visited without a museum ticket. The restaurant is managed by top chef Peeter Pihel, known for his passionate leadership in sustainable food preparation. In 2022, Fotografiska Restaurant was awarded a green Michelin star.

The center has numerous exhibition spaces, including the Vaal Gallery, the Juhan Kuusi Documentary Photography Center, and the outdoor galleries of Loomelinnaku Väligalerii and Kolme Puu galerii, the latter of which focuses on socially significant issues. There is also the Telliskivi Creative City Gallery on the center's shop streets. There are numerous pieces of street art around the center's outdoor areas.
