= List of streets in Pärnu =

This is a list of major streets in Pärnu, Estonia. The list is incomplete.

Estonian name	English translation	Other information	Image
Akadeemia tänav	Academy Street	Named after the Academia Gustavo-Carolina in Pärnu	
Haapsalu maantee	Haapsalu Road	Named after the town of Haapsalu	
Harju tänav	Harju Street	Named after Harju County	
Keskväljak	Central Square	Named for its location in the city center	
Kuninga tänav	King Street	Named for connecting city gates named after Swedish kings Karl and Karl Gustav	
Nikolai tänav	Nicholas Street	Named after St. Nicholas's Church in Pärnu	
Pikk tänav	Long Street	Named after its length by the 16th century	
Rüütli tänav	Knight Street	A continuation of the historical German name Ritterstraße 'Knight Street'	

== See also ==
- List of streets in Narva
- List of streets in Tallinn
- List of streets in Tartu
