= Jori Harju =

Finnish two-star admiral (born 1964)

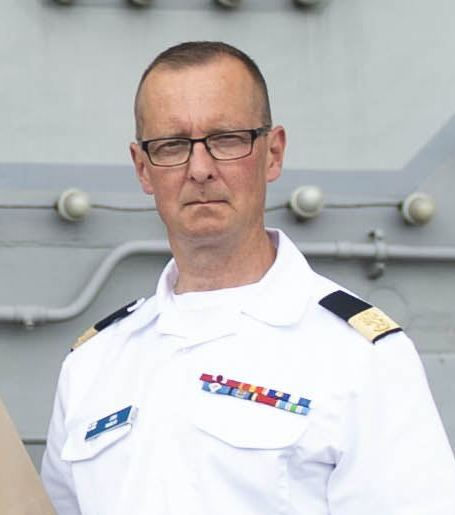
- Harju in August 2019
- Born: Jori Matias Harju; 20 October 1964 (age 61); Alajärvi, Finland
- Military career
- Allegiance: Finland
- Branch: Finnish Navy
- Service years: 1990–present
- Rank: Counter admiral
- Commands: Finnish Navy 2019–present
- Conflicts: UNIFIL
- Awards: Commander of the Order of the Lion of Finland; Medal for Military Merits (Finland); United Nations Medal

Jori Matias Harju (born 20 October 1964) is a Finnish two-star admiral. He has served as the Commander of the Finnish Navy since January 2019.

Harju was promoted to be Commander of the Finnish Navy after serving as the Chief of Operations of the Navy from 2016 to 2019, ranked as Captain (kommodori in Finnish). His selection was seen by some as surprising, as he was younger by rank than flotilla admiral Timo Hirvonen, then Chief of Staff of the Navy.

Harju has previously served i.e. as Chief of Operations of the Navy, as a Sector Commander in the United Nations Interim Force in Lebanon, as the Chief of the Finnish Joint Operations Centre, and as the Commander of the Suomenlinna Coastal Regiment.
