= Bekker Port =

Port in Estonia

Bekker port
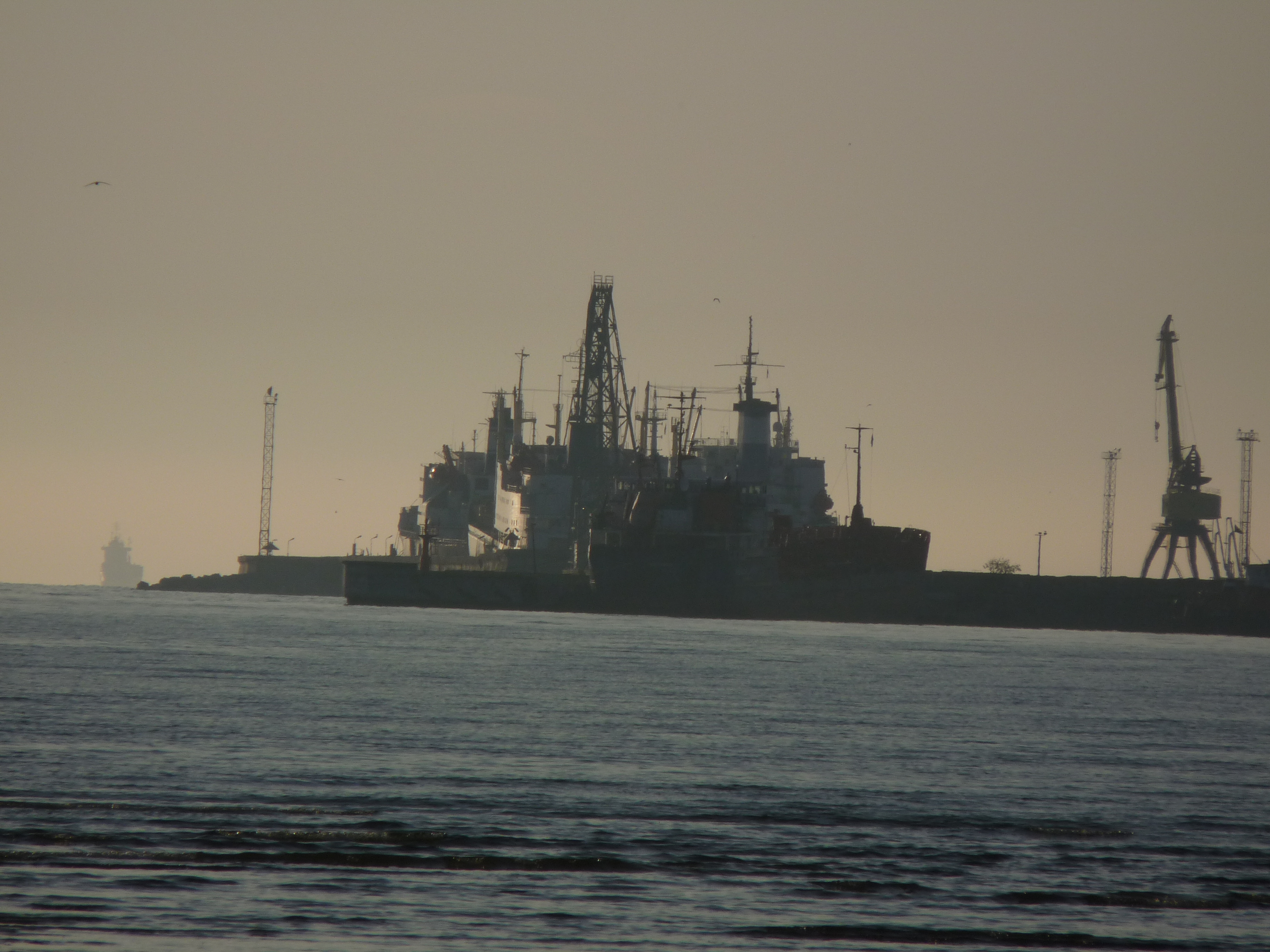
- Bekker Port seen from Stroomi Beach in Pelguranna
- Interactive map of Bekker port

Location
- Country: Estonia
- Location: Kopli, Tallinn
- Coordinates: 59°27′14″N 24°40′03″E

Details
- Opened: 1913
- Operated by: Tallinn Bekker Port Ltd.
- Size of harbour: 336,300 square metres (33.63 ha)
- Land area: 141,171 square metres (14.1171 ha)
- No. of berths: 4

Statistics
- Vessel arrivals: 281 vessels (2011)
- Annual cargo tonnage: 562,331.349 tonnes (2011)
- Website www.tallinnbekkerport.com

Logo of Bekker Port

Bekker Port (Estonian: Bekkeri sadam) is a seaport situated in Kopli, Tallinn, Estonia, located on the northeastern coast of the Kopli Bay (part of the Tallinn Bay).

== See also ==
- Transport in Estonia
