= List of beaches in Estonia =

This is the list of beaches located in Estonia. The list is incomplete.

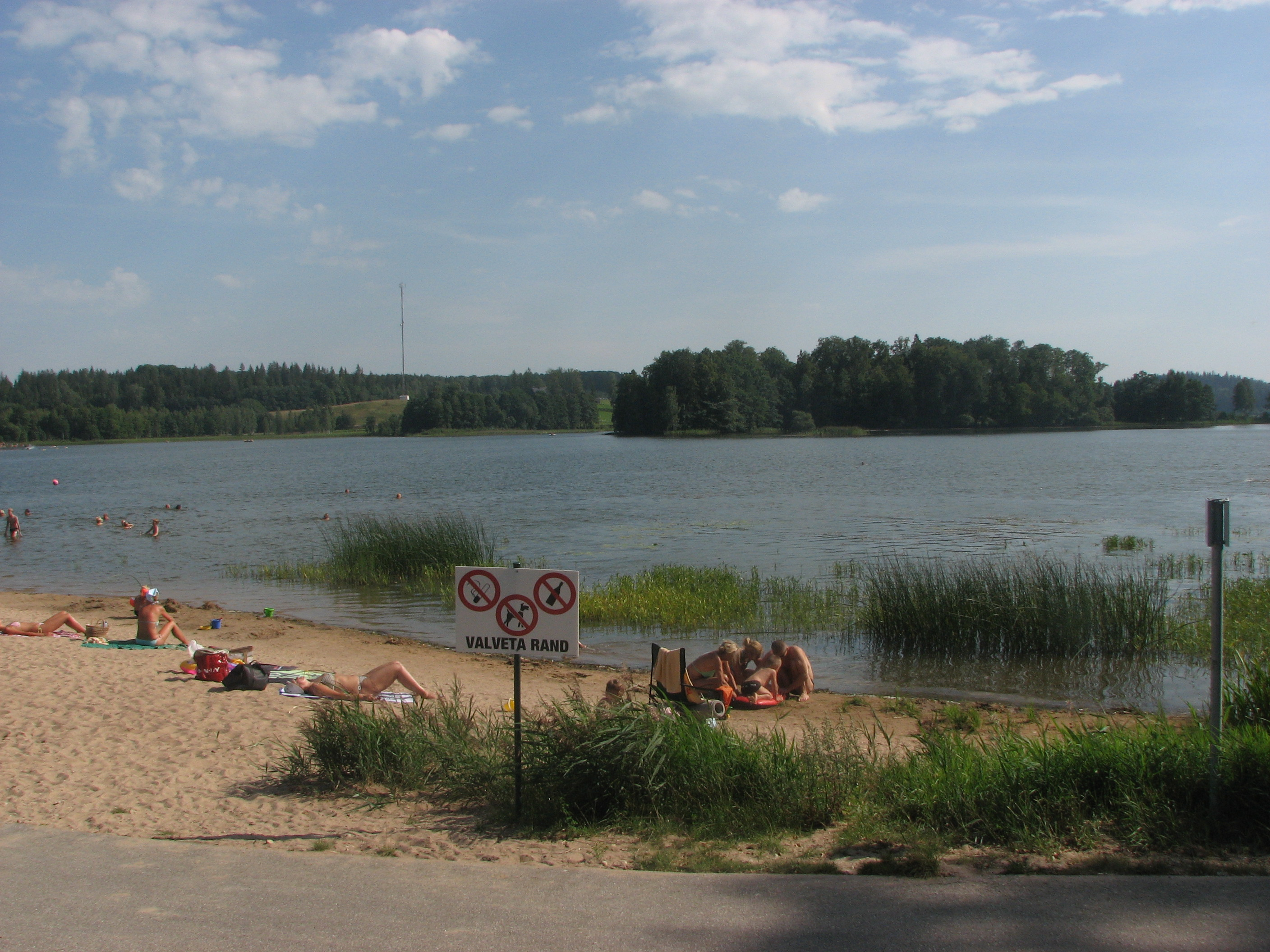
The beach at Pühajärv

- Aa
- Anne Canal
- Emajõe
- Haabneeme
- Harku
- Joaoru
- Kaberneeme
- Kakumäe
- Kärdla
- Kauksi
- Klooga
- Kubija
- Kuremaa
- Kuressaare
- Narva-Jõesuu
- Paide Artificial Lake
- Paralepa
- Pärnu
- Pelgurand = Stroomi Beach
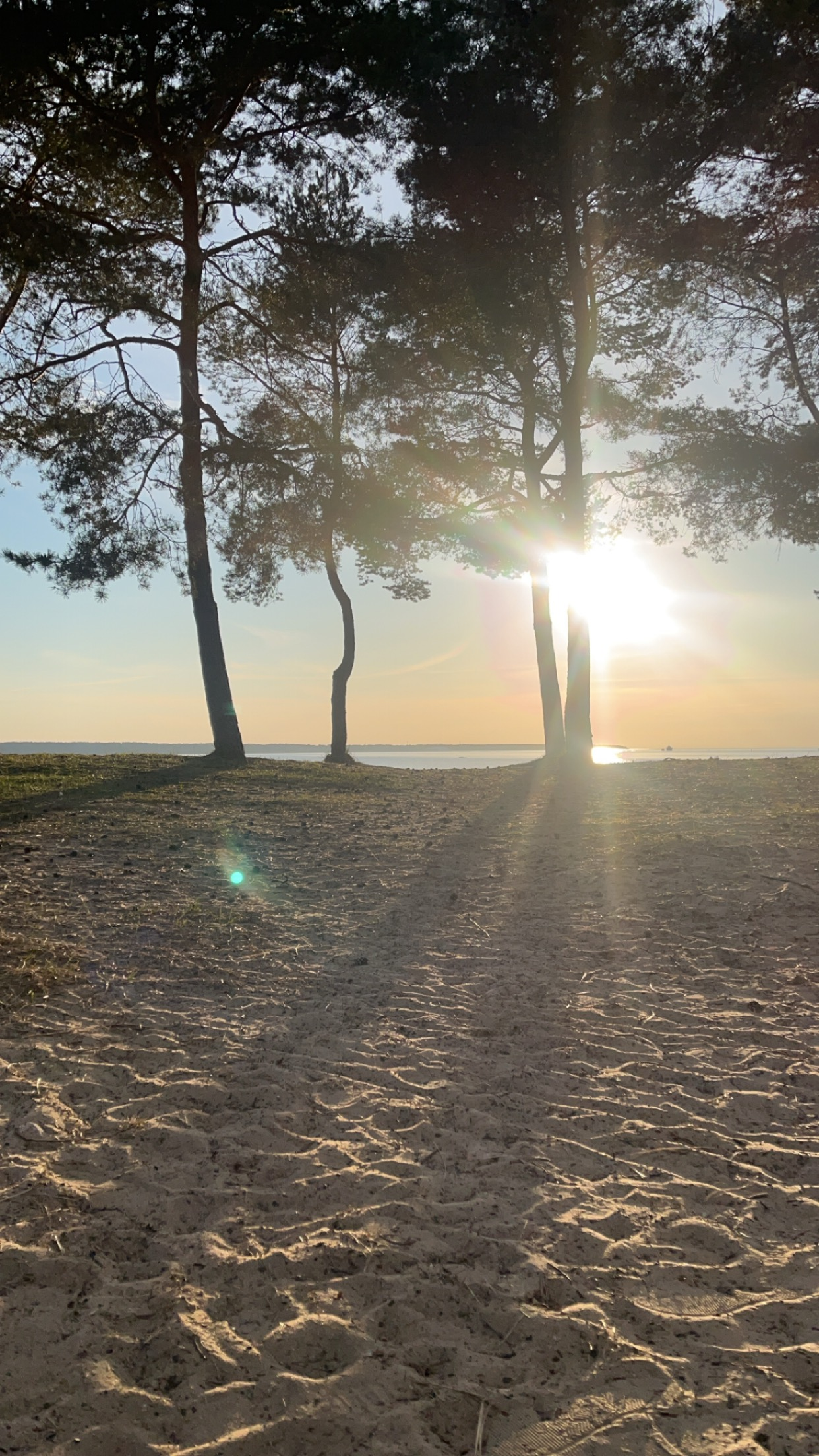
  Stroomi beach
- Pikakari Beach
- Pirita Beach (the largest sand beach in Tallinn)
- Pühajärv
- Riiska
- Stroomi Beach = Pelgurand
- Tallinn
- Tamula
- Toila
- Türi
- Valkla
- Vanamõisa
- Värska
- Verevi
- Viljandi
- Võsu
