= Pelguranna =

Subdistrict of Tallinn, Estonia

Coordinates: 59.448544°N 24.690979°E

- Subdistrict of Tallinn
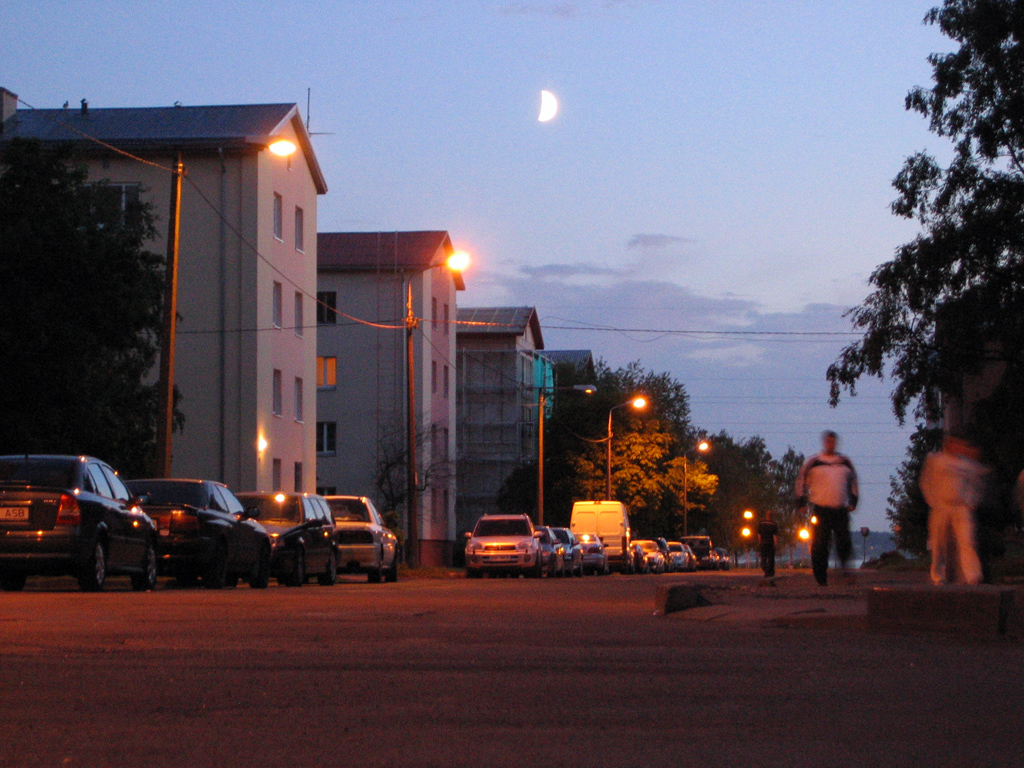
- Typical 4-story apartments on Kari street.

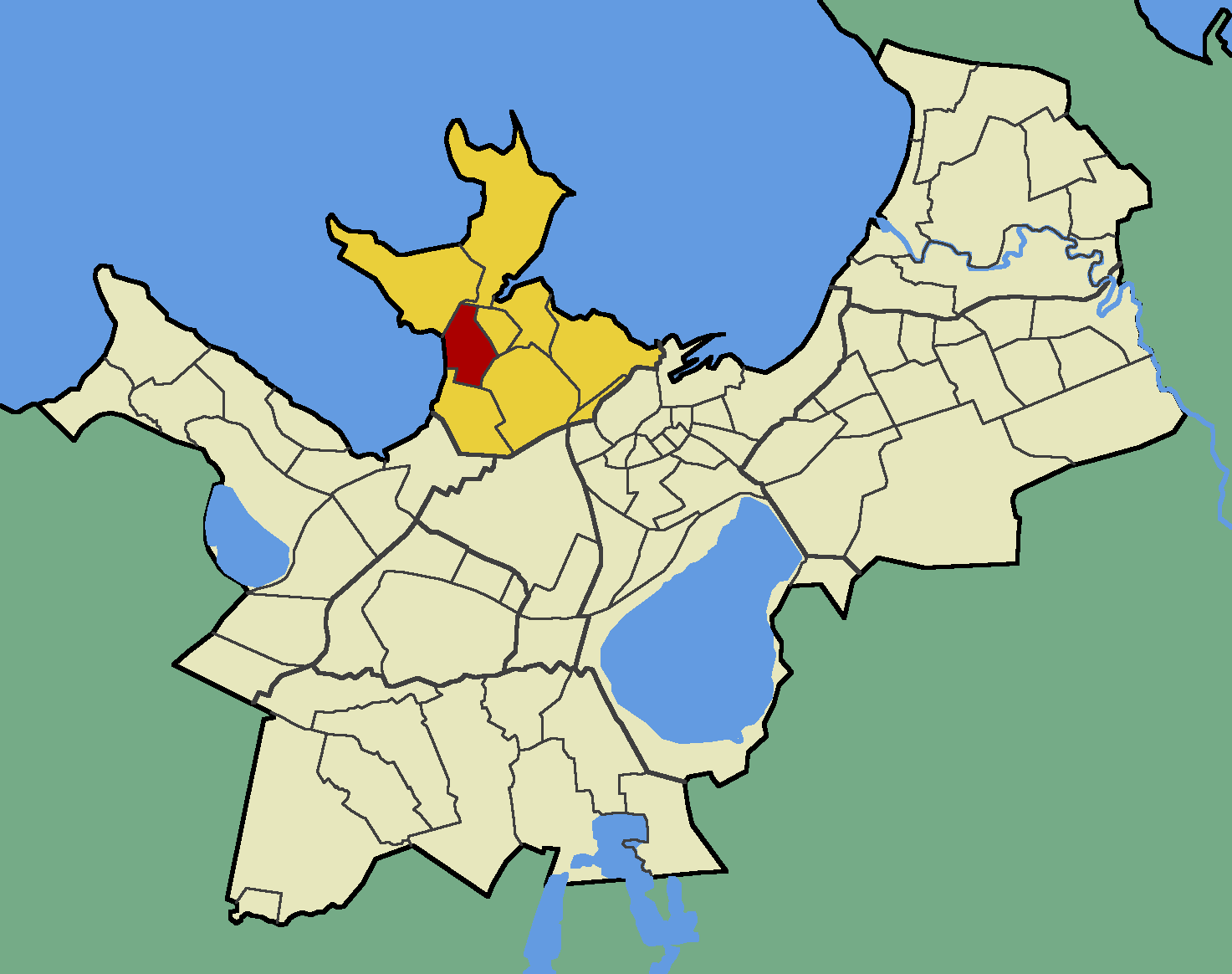
- Pelguranna within Põhja-Tallinn.
- Country: Estonia
- County: Harju County
- City: Tallinn
- District: Põhja-Tallinn

Population (01.01.2022)
  - Total: 14,126

Pelguranna (Estonian for "Refuge Beach") is a subdistrict (asum) in the district of Põhja-Tallinn (North Tallinn) in Tallinn, the capital of Estonia. It is located between Pelgulinn, Kopli and Sitsi and is bordered with the Stroomi Beach by the Kopli Bay (part of Tallinn Bay) to the west, and the Merimets forest park to the south. Houses there mostly consist of 4-9 floor apartment buildings. Pelguranna has a population of 14,126 (As of 1 January 2022).

The construction of first residential buildings started in the end of the 1940s. The area was previously known as Sitsi karjamaa ("Sitsi pasture") but was primarily a wasteland with some kitchen gardens. With its small quarters, Pelguranna was one of the first complexly built neighborhoods in Tallinn (by architects K. Luts and August Volberg). Besides the apartment buildings, there were built schools, kindergartens, shops, a polyclinic and a cinema. That area makes up the northern half of the nowadays Pelguranna. The southern part was built from 1960s to the 1980s and consists of pre-fabricated panel houses.

The main recreational area is the Stroomi Beach (also known as Pelgurand), which is also one of two most popular beaches in Tallinn (the other being Pirita Beach in Pirita).

== Gallery ==
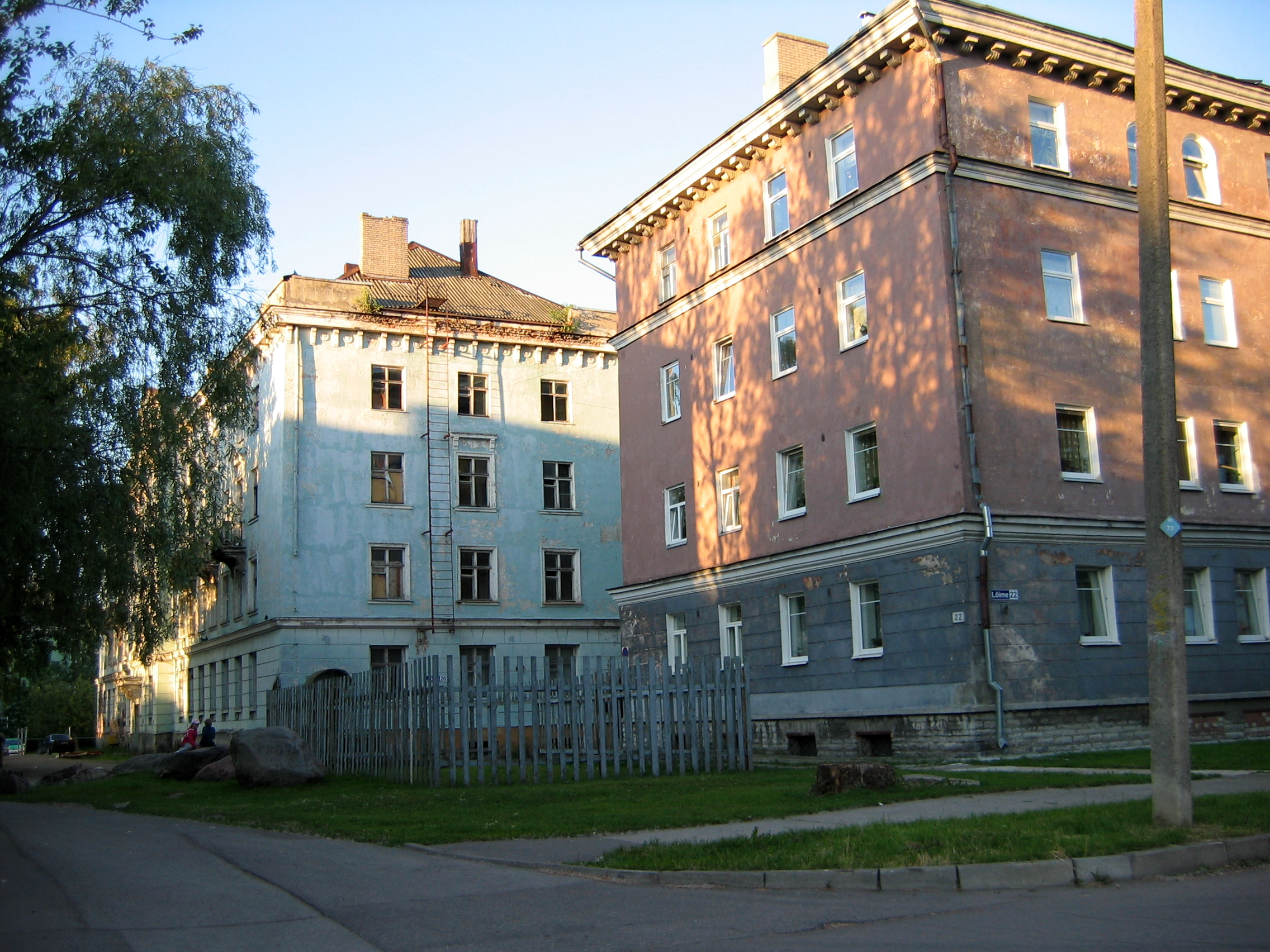
Older part of Pelguranna, built in the 1950s.

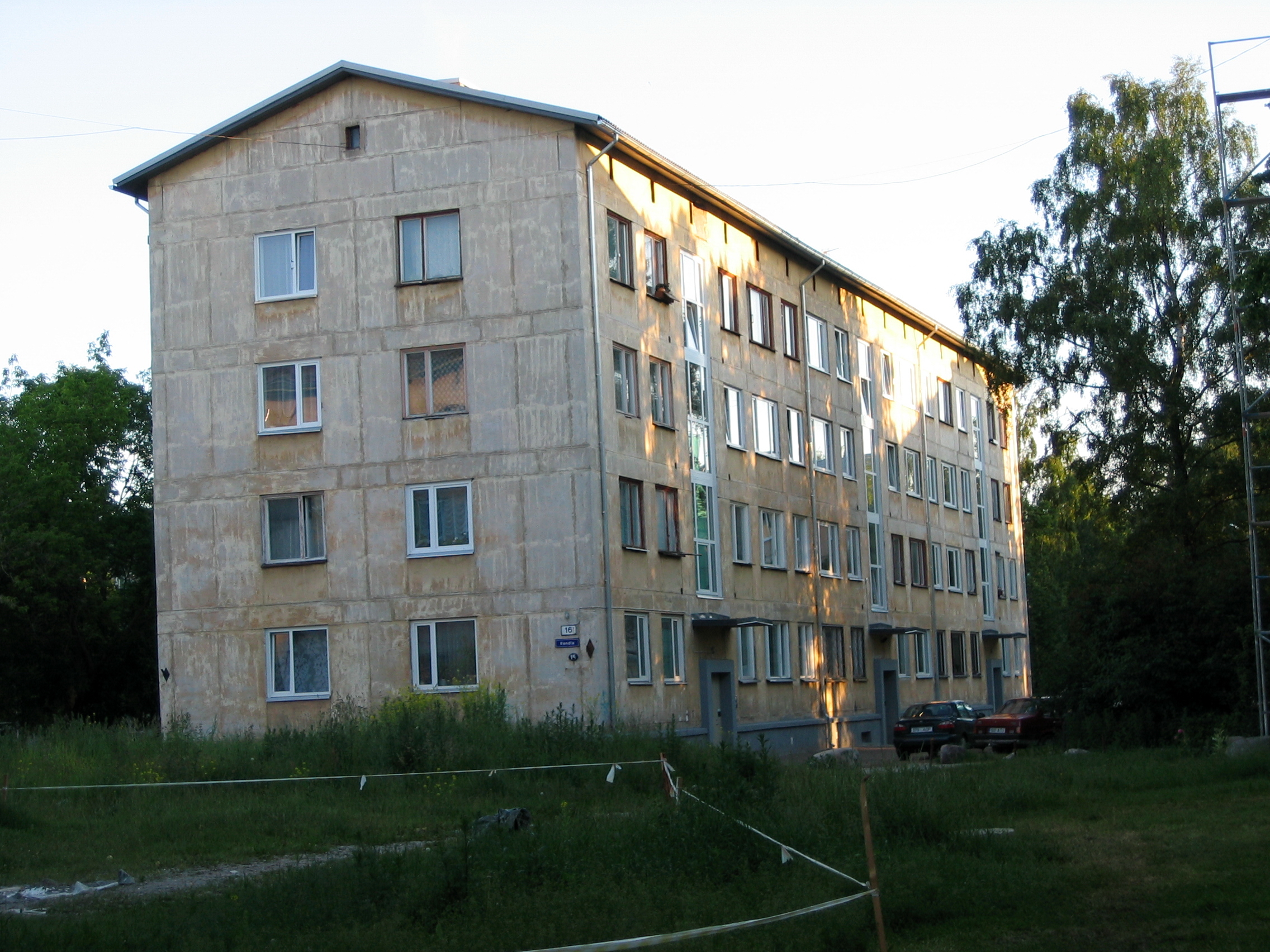

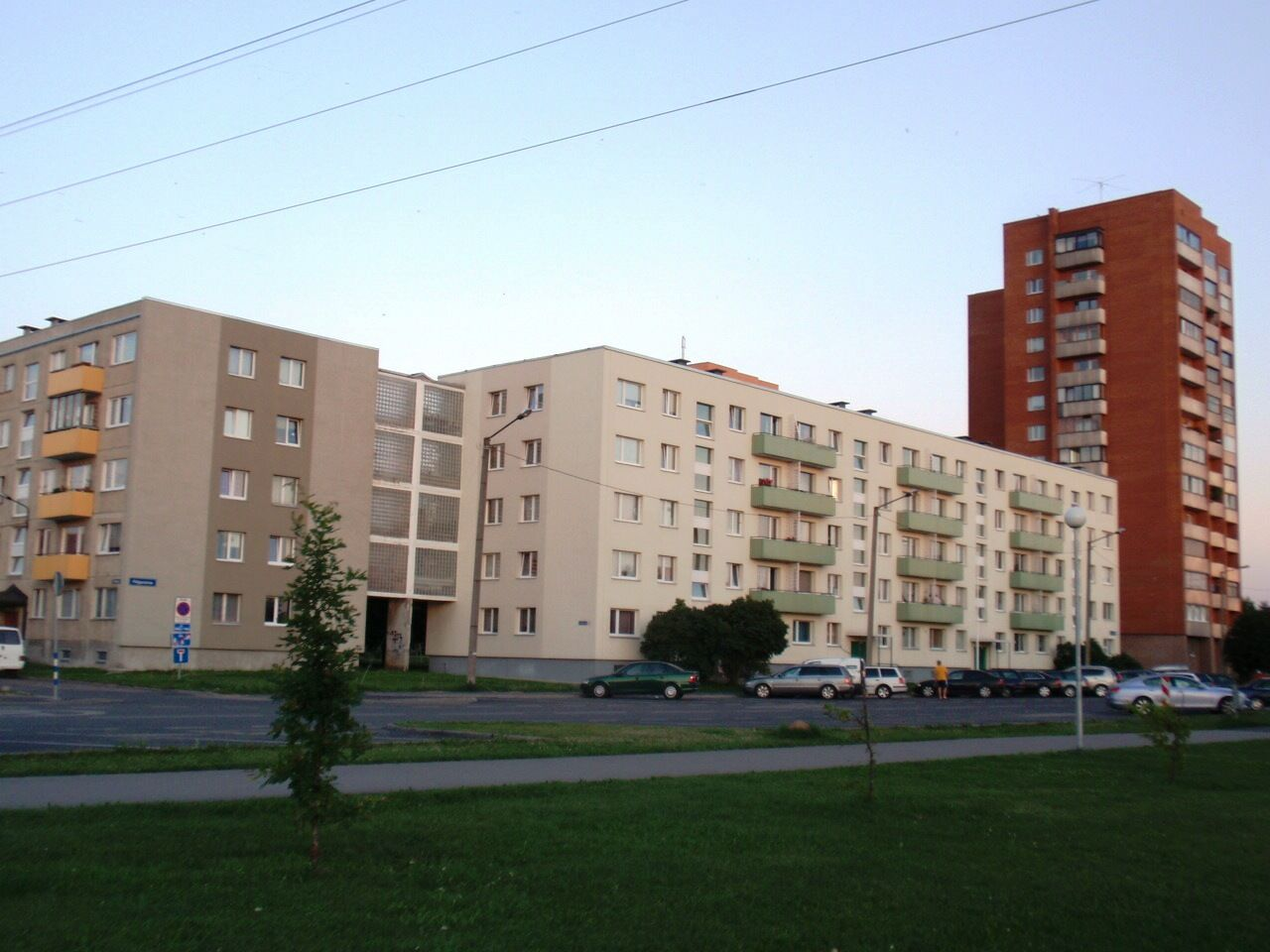
Blocks from the 1970s.

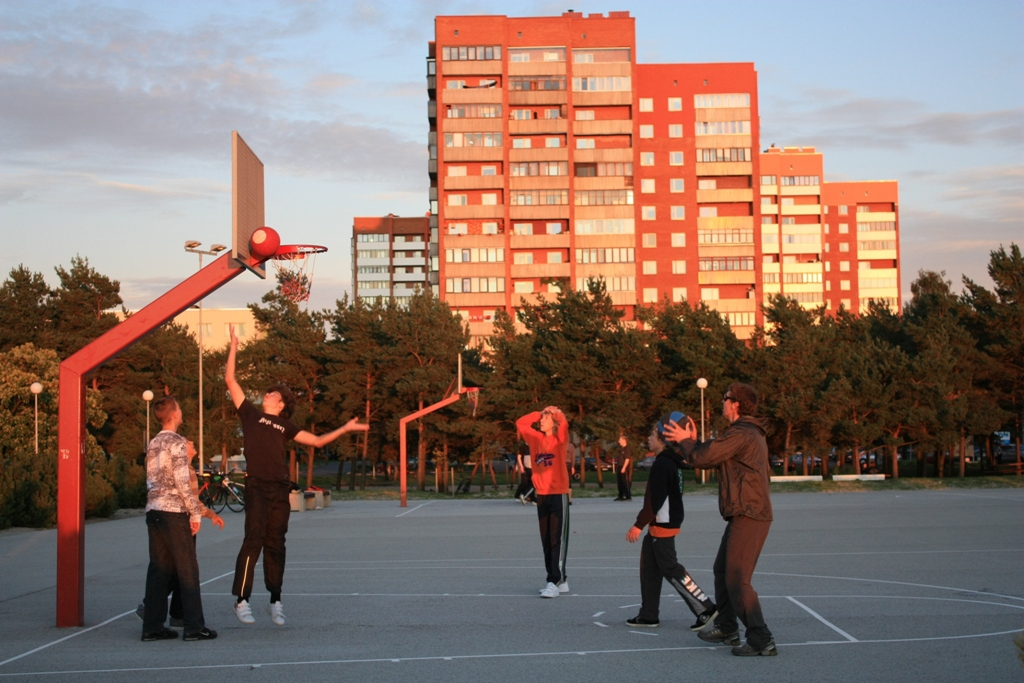
View at the 14-story apartments from the Stroomi Beach.

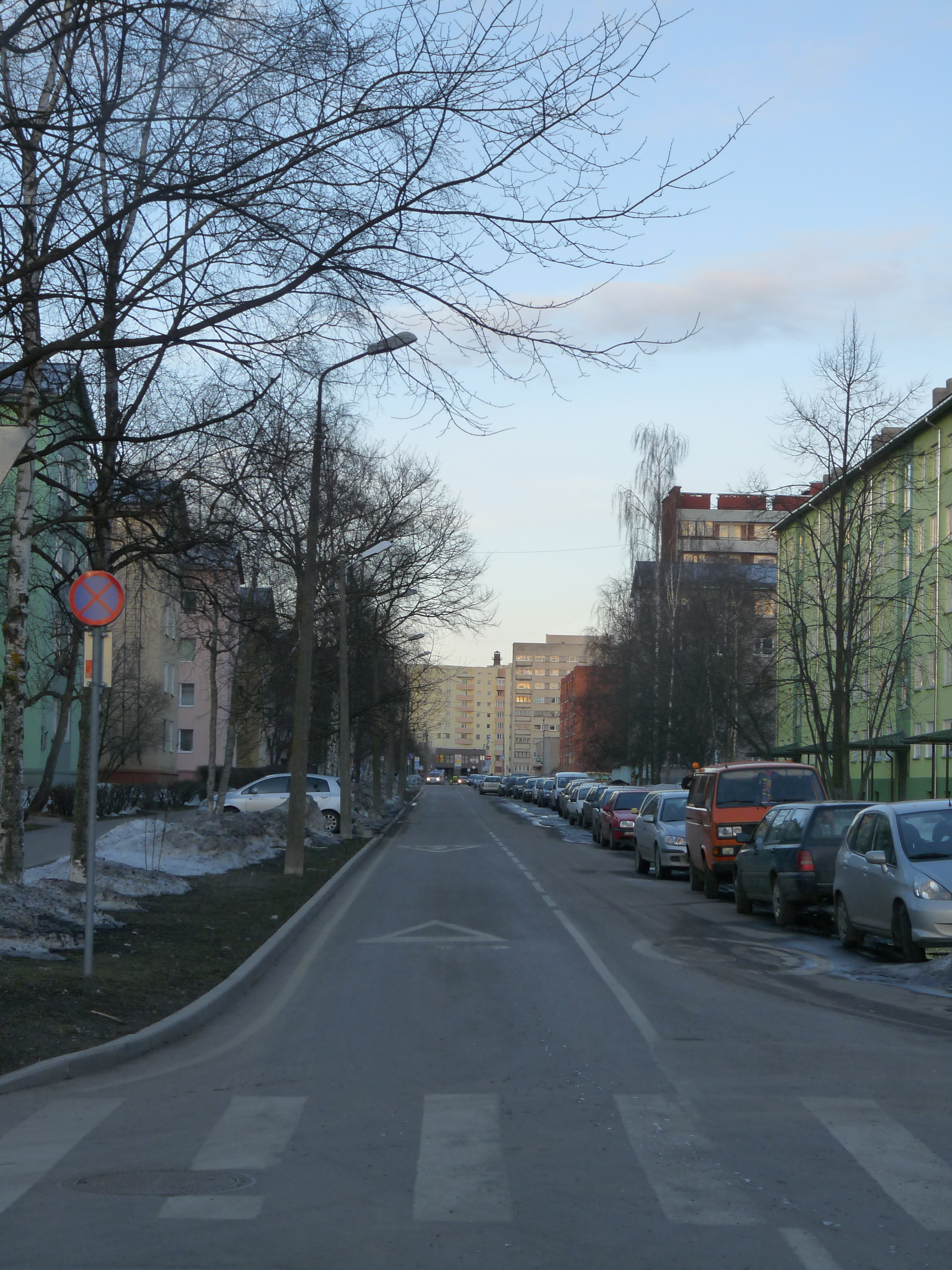
Street view

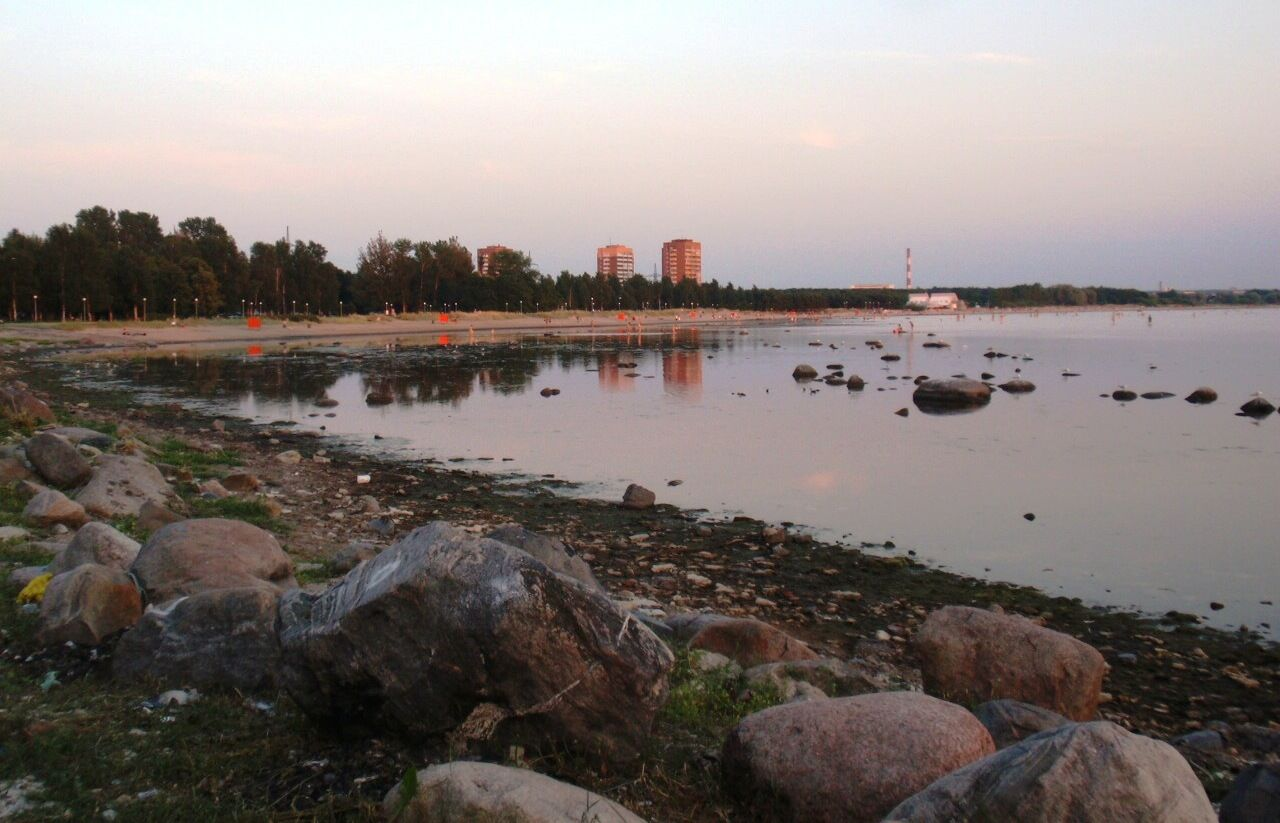
Stroomi Beach

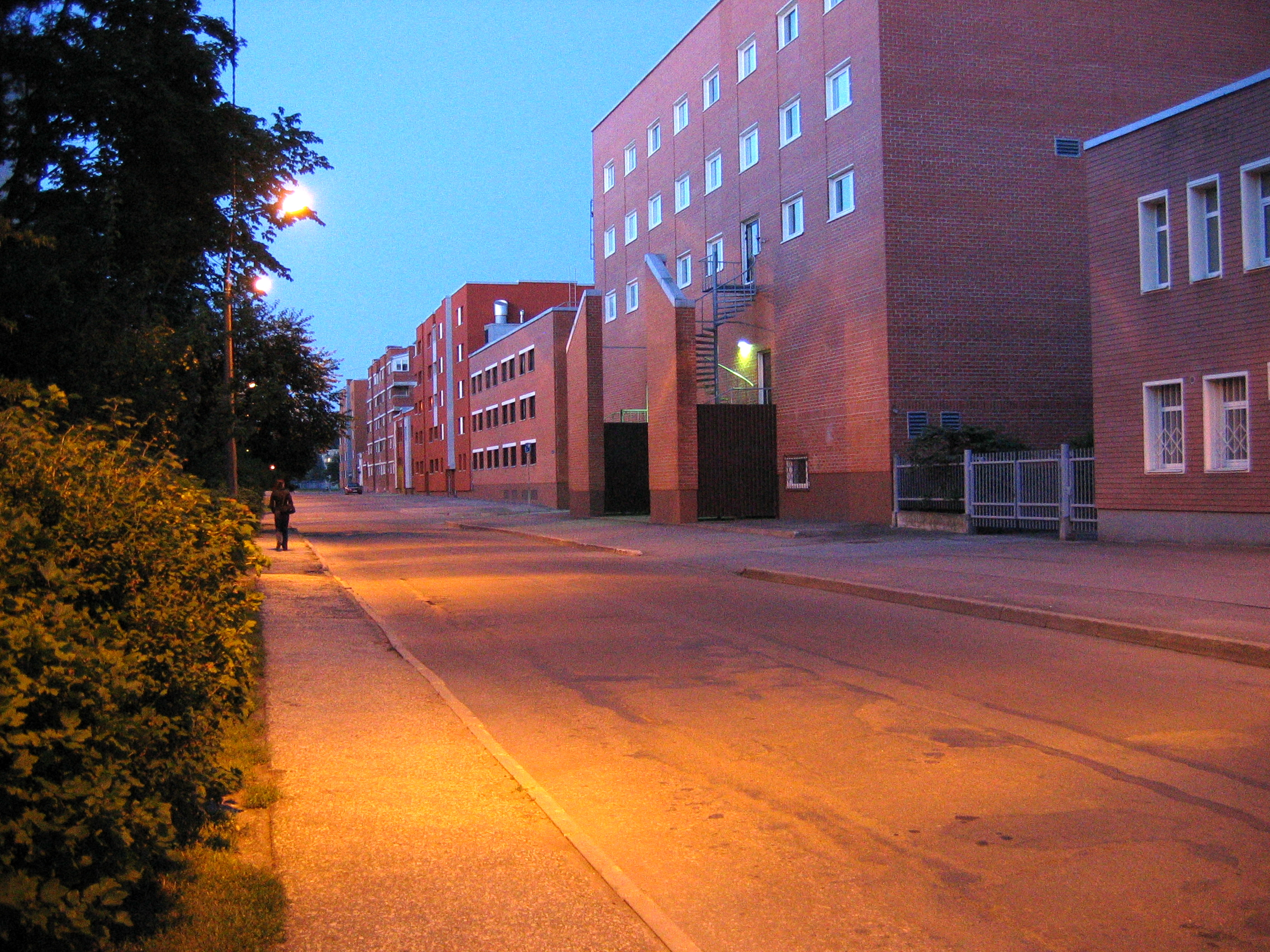
Kingdom Hall of Jehovah's Witnesses

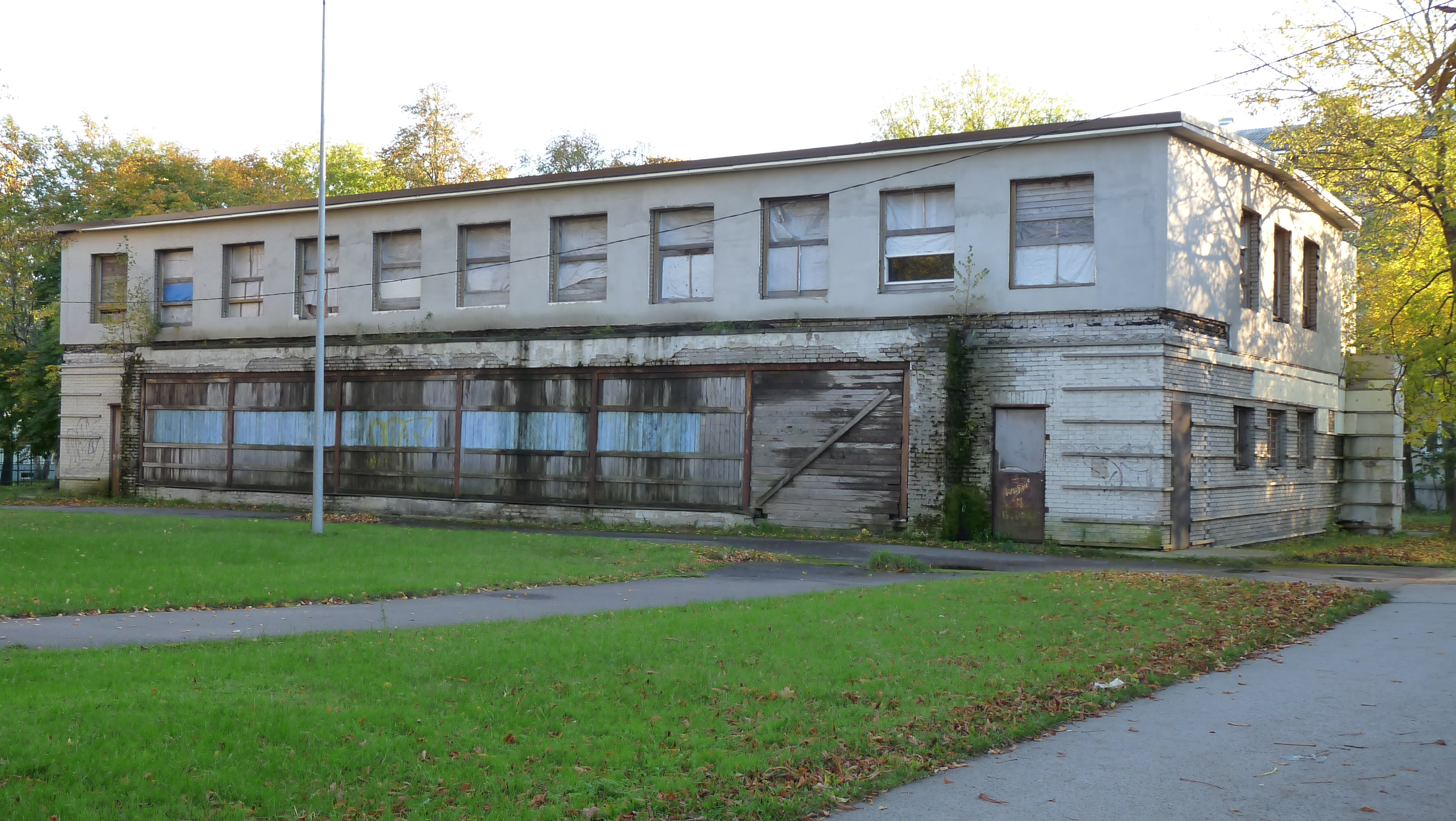
Abandoned service building (now demolished)
