= Lake Nigula =

Lake in Estonia

- Nigula järv (Estonian)
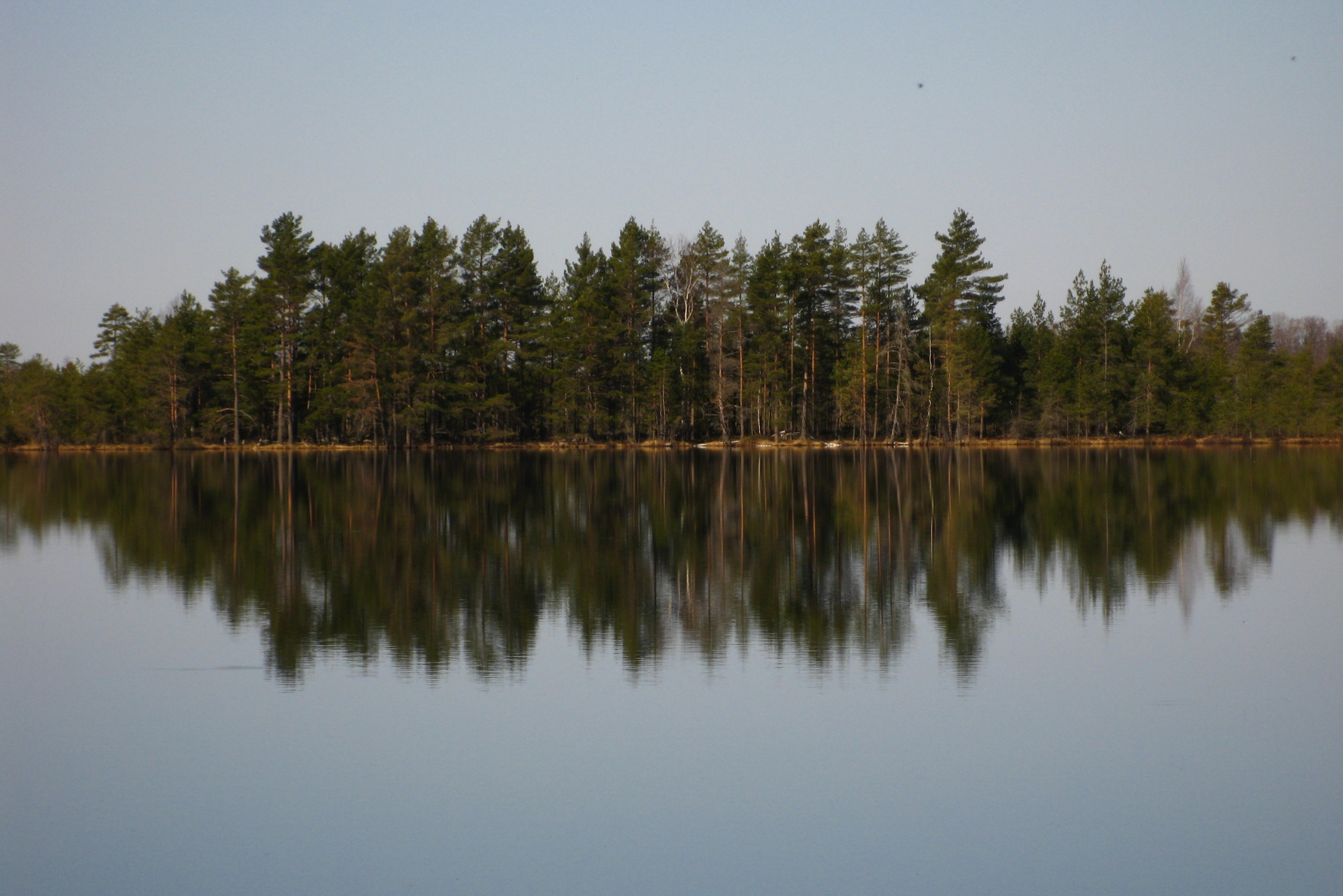

- Location within Estonia
- Location: Häädemeeste Parish, Pärnu County, Estonia
- Coordinates: 58°0.5′N 24°42.5′E
- Basin countries: Estonia
- Max. length: 830 meters (2,720 ft)
- Max. width: 450 meters (1,480 ft)
- Surface area: 20.4 hectares (50 acres)
- Average depth: 2.5 meters (8 ft 2 in)
- Max. depth: 3.5 meters (11 ft)
- Water volume: 501,000 cubic meters (17,700,000 cu ft)
- Shore length^{1}: 2,420 meters (7,940 ft)
- Surface elevation: 54.9 meters (180 ft)
- ^{1} Shore length is not a well-defined measure.

Lake Nigula (Estonian: Nigula järv, also Nigula Vanajärv, Vanajärve järv, Vanamõisa järv, Vanajarve järv, or Vanassaare järv) is a lake in Estonia. It is located in the village of Uuemaa in Häädemeeste Parish, Pärnu County.

== Physical description ==
The lake has an area of 20.4 hectares (50 acres). The lake has an average depth of 2.5 meters (8 ft 2 in) and a maximum depth of 3.5 meters (11 ft). It is 830 meters (2,720 ft) long, and its shoreline measures 2,420 meters (7,940 ft). It has a volume of 501,000 cubic meters (17,700,000 cu ft).

== See also ==
- List of lakes of Estonia
