= Port of Meeruse =

Port in Estonia

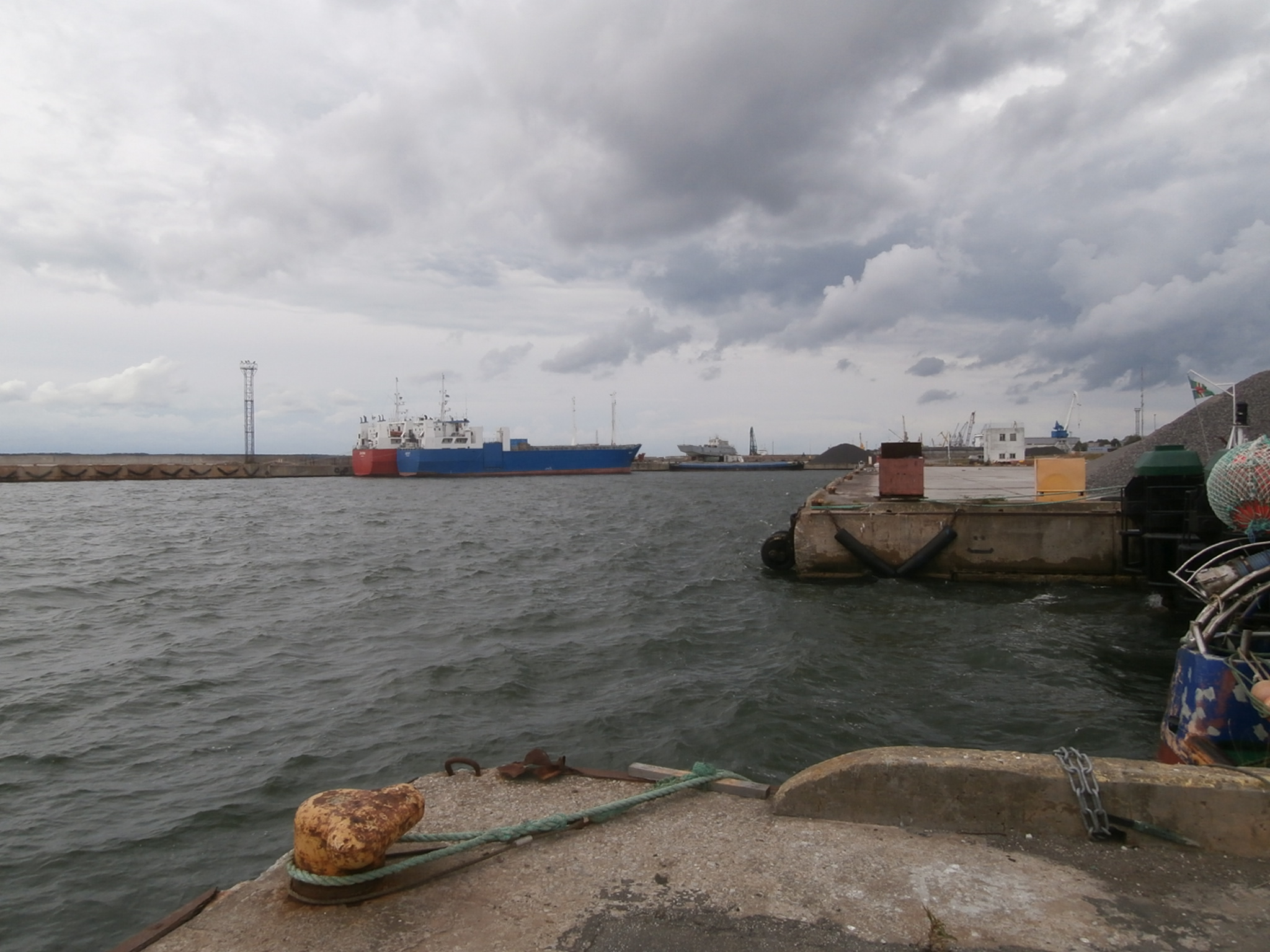
- Berthed cargo vessels in the Port of Meeruse

Location
- Country: Estonia
- Location: Kopli, Tallinn
- Coordinates: 59°27′03.15″N 24°40′20.17″E
- UN/LOCODE: EE MRS

Details
- Opened: 1 July 2004
- Operated by: OÜ Tallinna Bekkeri Sadam
- Land area: 72,327.1 square metres (7.23271 ha)
- No. of piers: 11

The Port of Meeruse (Estonian: Meeruse sadam) is a seaport on the southwestern coast of Kopli, Tallinn, Estonia, located in the eastern area of Kopli Bay.

== See also ==
- Transport in Estonia
