= Kopli =

Subdistrict of Tallinn, Estonia

Coordinates: 59.460218°N 24.670991°E

- Subdistrict of Tallinn
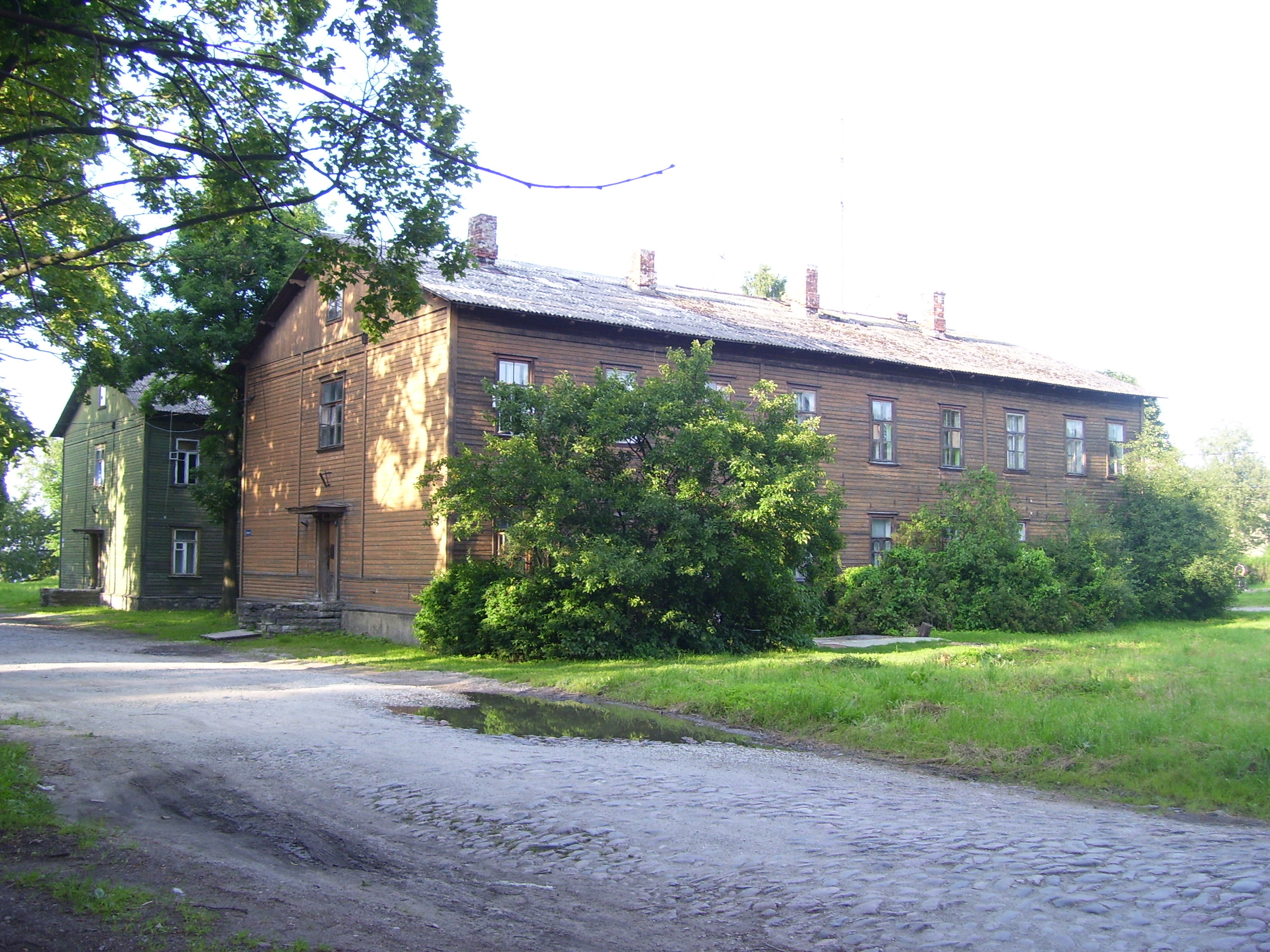
- Wooden workers' housing from the 1910s

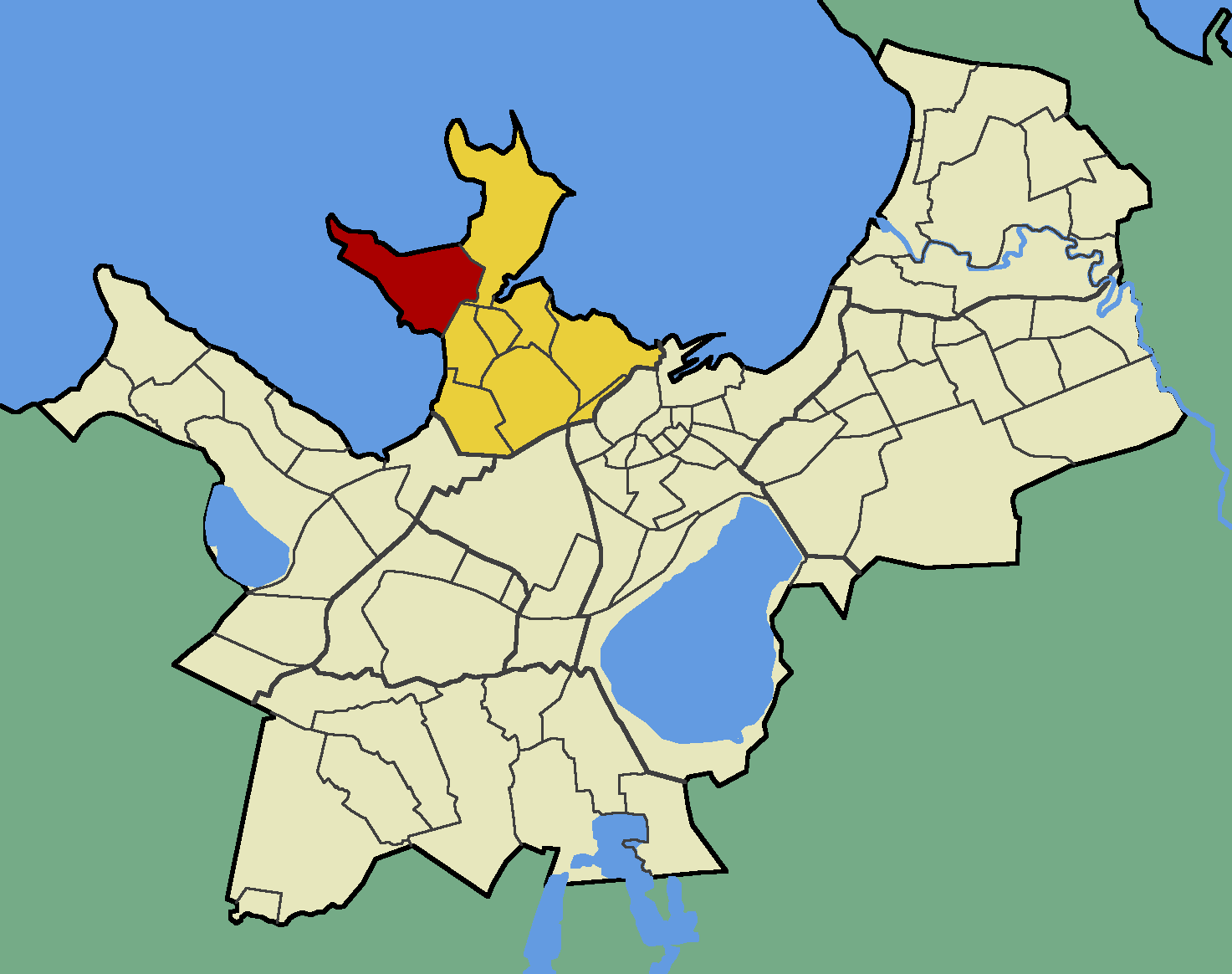
- Kopli within Põhja-Tallinn.
- Country: Estonia
- County: Harju County
- City: Tallinn
- District: Põhja-Tallinn

Population (01.01.2015)
  - Total: 7,240

Kopli (Estonian for 'paddock') is a subdistrict of the district of Põhja-Tallinn (Northern Tallinn) in Tallinn, the capital of Estonia. It is located on the Kopli Peninsula and is bordered by parts of Tallinn Bay, Kopli Bay to the southwest, and Paljassaare Bay to the north. Kopli has a population of 6,722 (as of 1 January 2022). Kopli's former German name until 1918 was Ziegelskoppel.

Bekker Port, which was erected for the Bekker Shipbuilding Yard in 1912 and 1913, is located in the area. In 1912 the Russo-Baltic Shipbuilding Yard, which is now BLRT Grupp, was also set up in the area. The Port of Meeruse is also located in Kopli.

The subdistrict is served by the city's 1, 2, and 5 tram routes, as well as the 32 and 72 bus routes. It is also home to Kopli tram depot, Tallinn's largest.

Tram services
Preceding station	Trams in Tallinn	Following station
Sepa towards Kadriorg	1	Terminus
Sepa towards Suur-Paala	2	Terminus
Sepa towards Vana-Lõuna	5	Terminus

Estonian Maritime Academy is located in Kopli.

== Cemetery ==
Kopli was the former location of the largest Lutheran Baltic German cemetery in Tallinn, known as Kopli cemetery (Estonian: Kopli kalmistu; German: Friedhof von Ziegelskoppel) which was founded around 1774. The cemetery was destroyed in 1950–1951 by the Soviet authorities, during the second occupation of the Baltic states, so they could use Kopli as a base for the Soviet Armed Forces. The former cemetery is now a public park.

== Shipyards ==
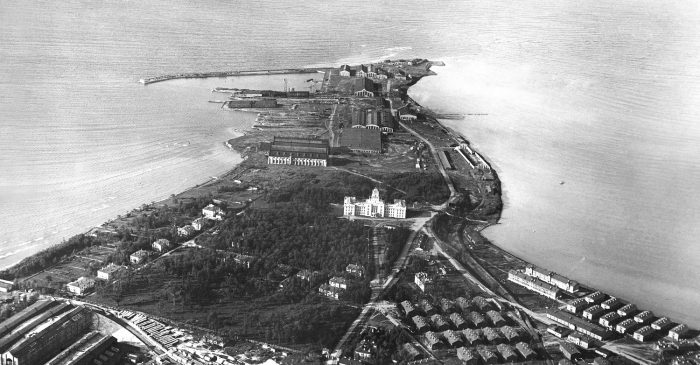
Russo-Baltic Shipyard's grounds at the beginning of the 20th century

The Russo-Baltic Shipyard (Estonian: Vene-Balti laevaehitustehas) was a shipyard located on the Kopli peninsula. It was one of the largest complexes in Estonia to be built from scratch. The project was mostly completed between 1912 and 1915. It covered a large area and fully changed the region's appearance.

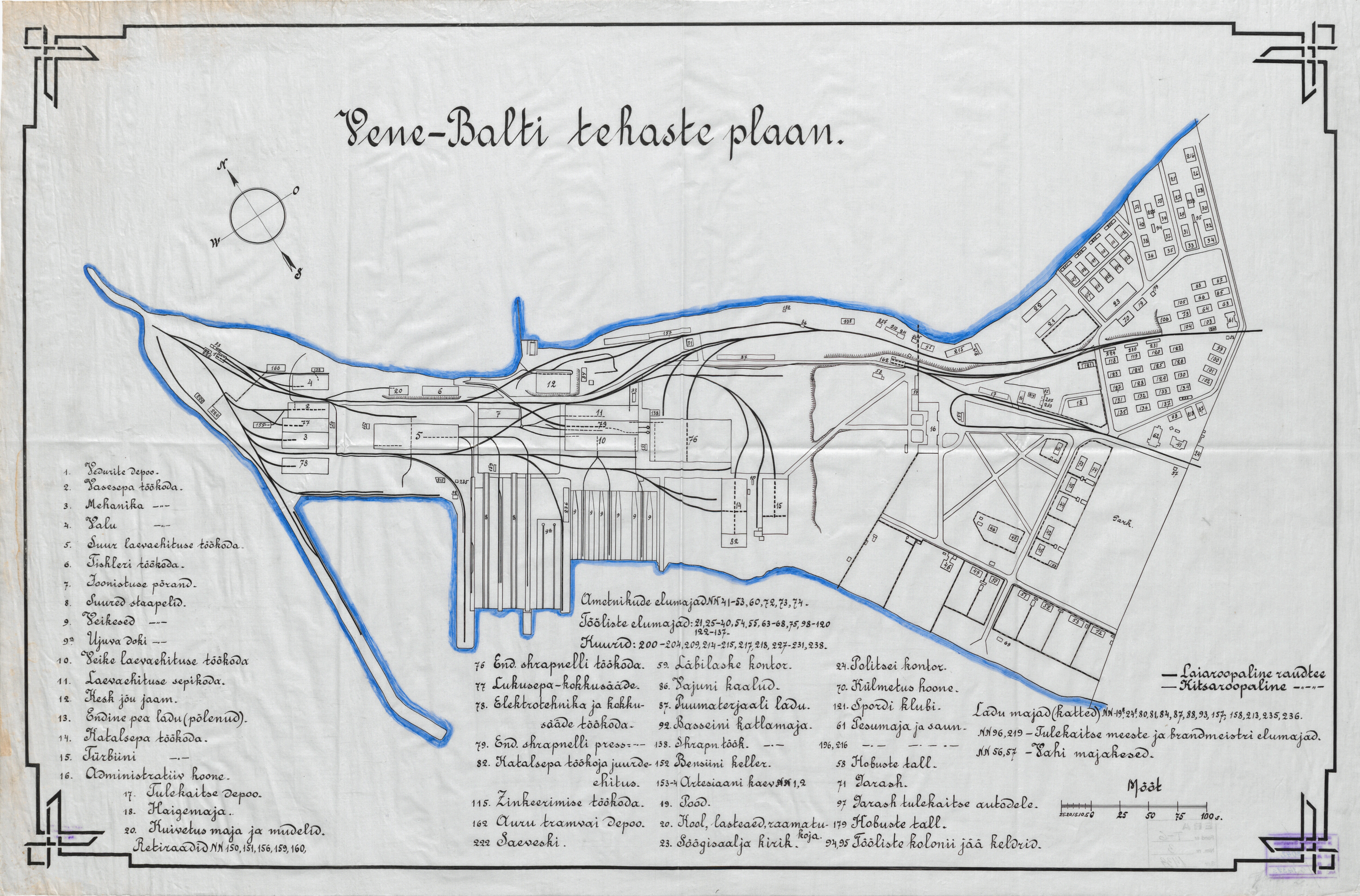
Plan of the Russo-Baltic Shipyard in Kopli, Tallinn (ca 1920)

After the Russian-Japanese War the Russian Empire needed a new shipyard and naval base. In 1911 it was decided that the new base would be in Tallinn and so three shipyards were built: Noblessner, Bekker and the Russo-Baltic shipyard. The shipyard, opened on 31st May 1913, was initially called “Russian-Baltic Shipbuilding and Mechanics Ltd”. The project was completed with technical and financial assistance of foreign capital from the French-Belgian company Schneider-Creusot.

Most of the buildings and constructions were designed according to the plans of the Russian architect Aleksandr Dmitriyev. Originally, the complex had everything a person could need, including homes, a hospital, a canteen, a church, a school, a cinema, a bakery, a post office, even a tram was put up to work. An orthodox church was also built, since most of the workers were of Russian origin. It was planned so that a worker could go their entire life without leaving the factory grounds. The region had its own power plant, which was eight times more powerful than the one serving the rest of Tallinn.

The newly formed region could provide accommodation for up to 1,000 workers at first, while in 1917 that number rose to between 7,000 and 10,000. The living quarters were built hierarchically. The manual laborers lived on the northern side of the peninsula, later called the Kopli lines (Estonian: Kopli Liinid), having accommodation in barracks. The most commonly built barrack had two stories and a corridor-based interior with rooms or apartments on both sides. Each house had running water and electricity. All houses were wooden, but some of them had a brick hallway - these were planned for families to inhabit, but higher-skilled workers moved into them instead. Two long barracks were planned for young workers without families.

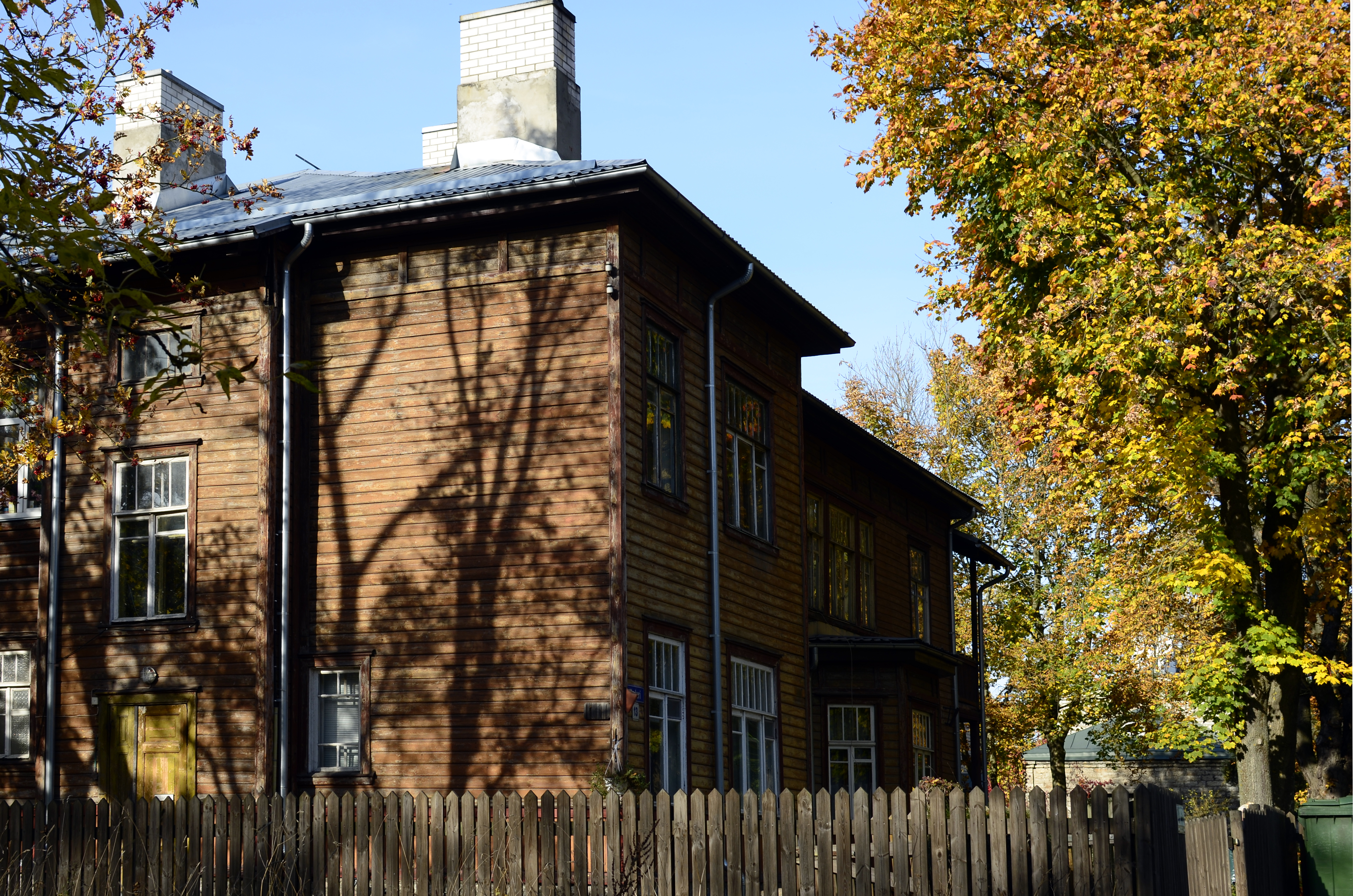
"Professors’ Village", Kopli

The Directors’, Engineers’ and Officers’ quarters were located on the southern side of the peninsula, on Süsta, Ketta and Kaluri streets. Those houses were different from the common workers’ houses, being more comfortable and fancier. Although each house has a unique look, all of them are wooden with a brick hallway, usually with a wooden roof. All of these buildings had a garden, and the Director and Deputy Director's houses (Kaluri 15 and 13) used to have large gardens reaching up to the sea.

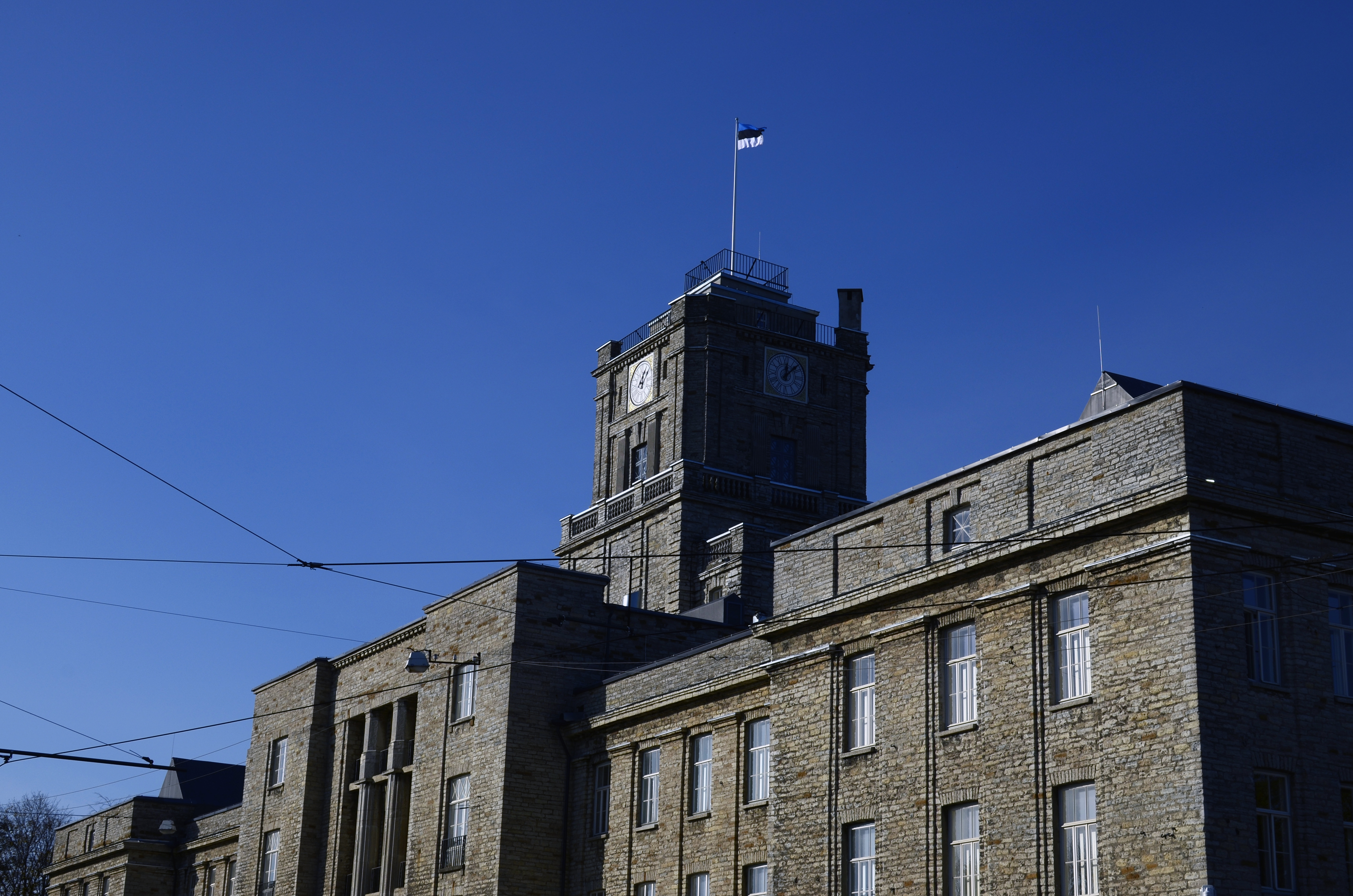
Estonian Maritime Academy of Tallinn University of Technology, located in the former main factory building

Due to the start of World War I, shipbuilding decreased. In 1917, the factory was evacuated. After the war, the empty barracks were used as hospitals. Later, the newly independent Estonian government tried to re-establish the factory but without luck. The machinery was sold and former soldiers came to live here.

The Kopli Real Estate Administration (Estonian: Kopli Kinnisvaravalitsus), later renamed to simply Kopli Real Estate (Estonian: Kopli Kinnisvarad) was formed to manage and fix the housing. The 1930s are considered Kopli's peak. The factory grounds were put in use again and the Tallinn University of Technology moved to the main building. The influx of academics saw the former Directors', Engineers' and Officers' quarters become known as the “Professors’ Village” (Estonian: Professorite küla).

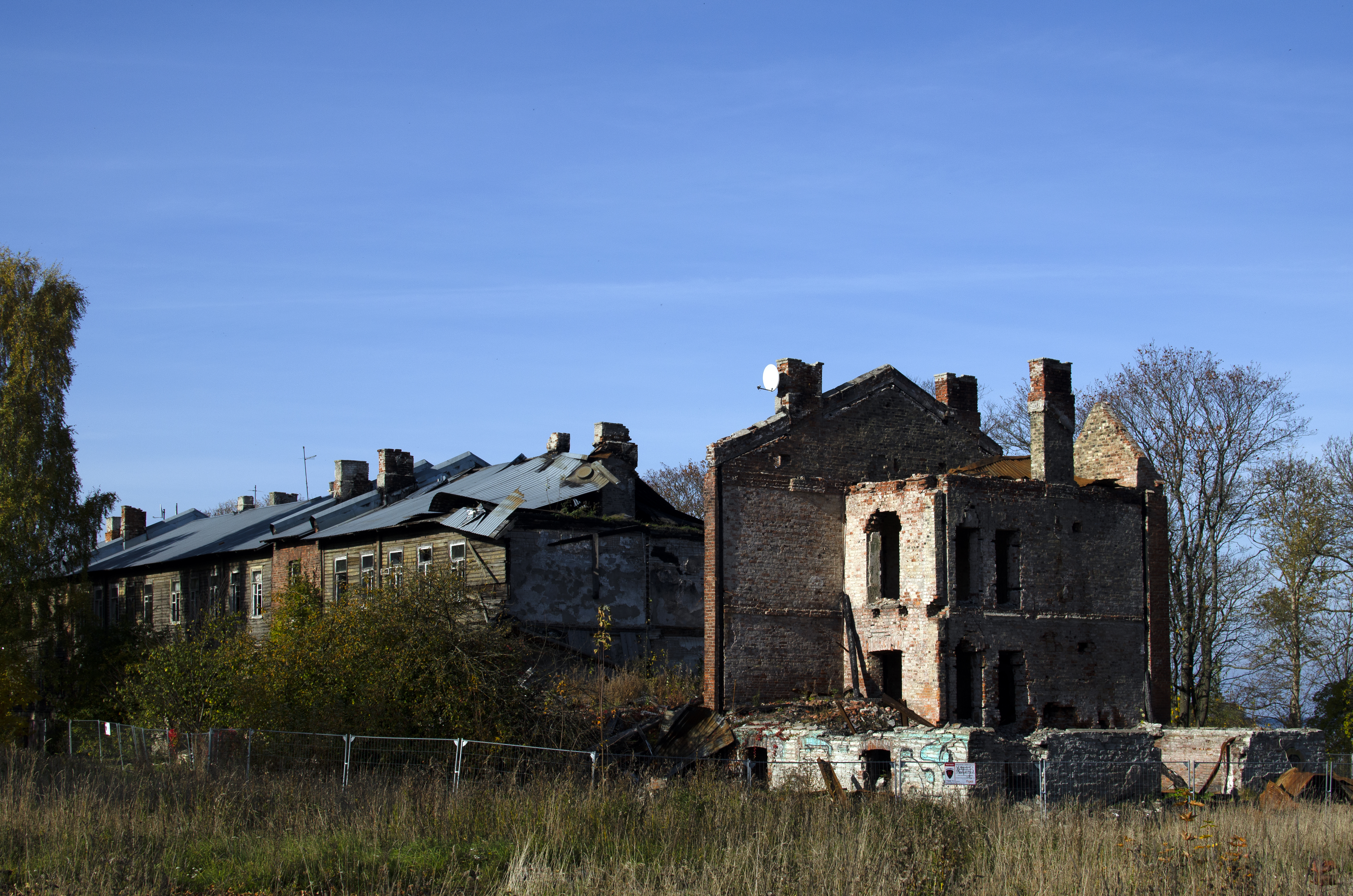
Residences in disrepair at the Kopli Lines

After World War II, many of the buildings were in ruins. The new administration, formed by the Soviet occupation of Estonia, founded a new shipyard, where repair work was done, later called the Baltic Ship Repair Factory (Estonian: Balti Laevaremondi Tehas). New factory buildings were built. However, the university still remained in the main building. Around the same time, the streets were given names for the first time. However, the workers' part was instead given numbered 'lines'. In addition, the new factory's workers were no longer housed there, so after the 1960s, the region suffered a rapid downfall. The houses were poorly maintained and inhabited by drunkards, former convicts and others experiencing troubles. The Soviet government had plans to demolish the worker's part since the 1970s, but there were problems with ownership due to uncertainty, and it was never completed.

After Estonia regained its independence, the factory became one of the most important in the country, and to this day approximately 1000 people work in the production lines. The site contains both original buildings from the Tsarist period and buildings from Soviet times. The Estonian Maritime Academy moved into the main building of the factory at the beginning of the 21st Century, taking good care of the building. The former workers' houses did not fare as well: in the early 2000s, they were inhabited by homeless people and often caught on fire. After a while, the government decided to privatise the wooden houses with a view to either restore or demolish them; in the end they decided to look for a foreign investor to renovate them and thereby improve the region's reputation. In 2015, Fund Ehitus, an Estonian construction firm, started a new development in the Kopli lines. Today, many of the old houses have been reconstructed and new houses, designed by Kino Maastikuarhitektid, Apex and Peeter Pere Architects have been built, with more still to come.

== Gallery ==
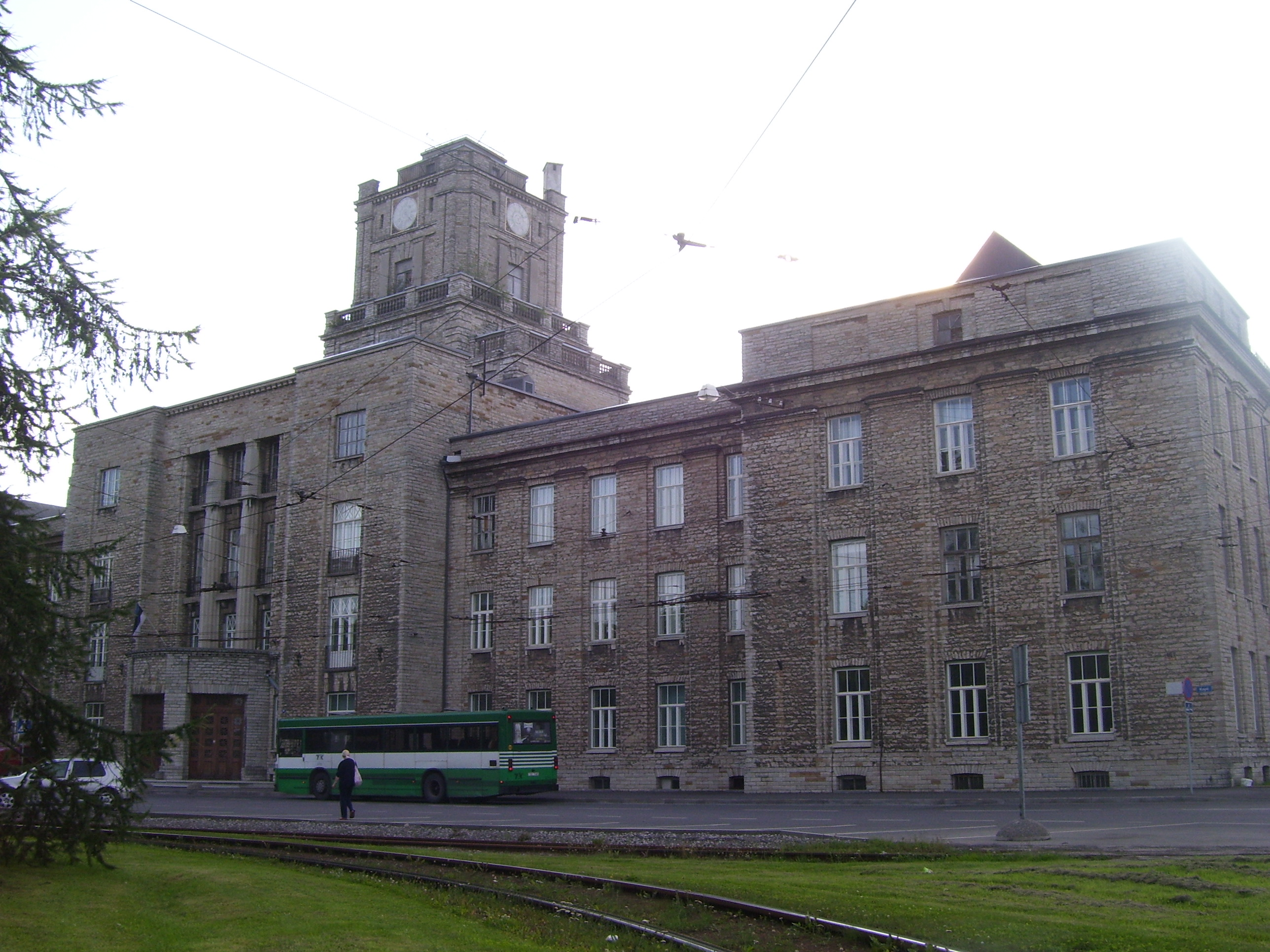
Estonian Maritime Academy (formerly the main building of Tallinn University of Technology, 1932–1964).

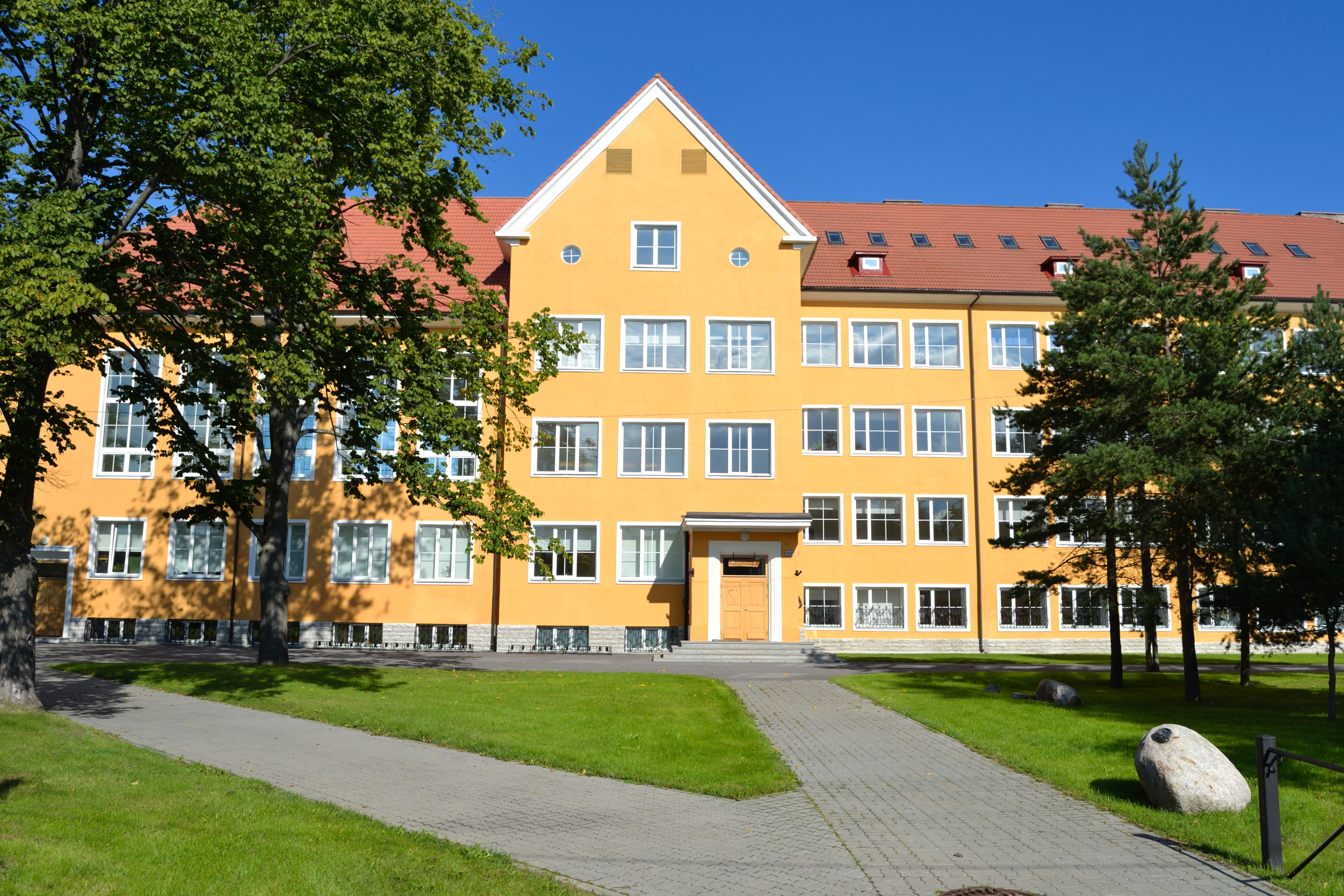
Tallinn Art Gymnasium.

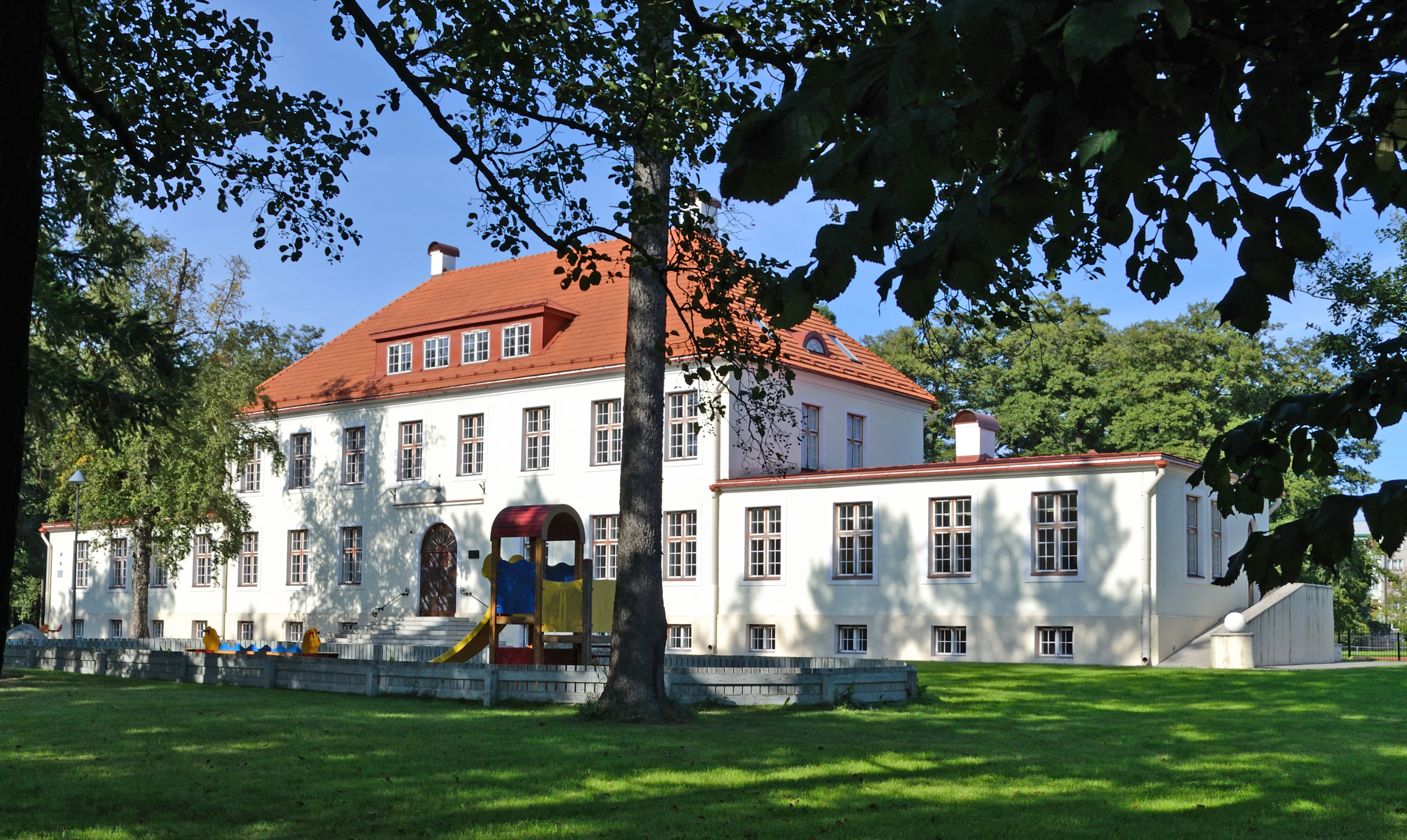
Children's kindergarten and nursery.

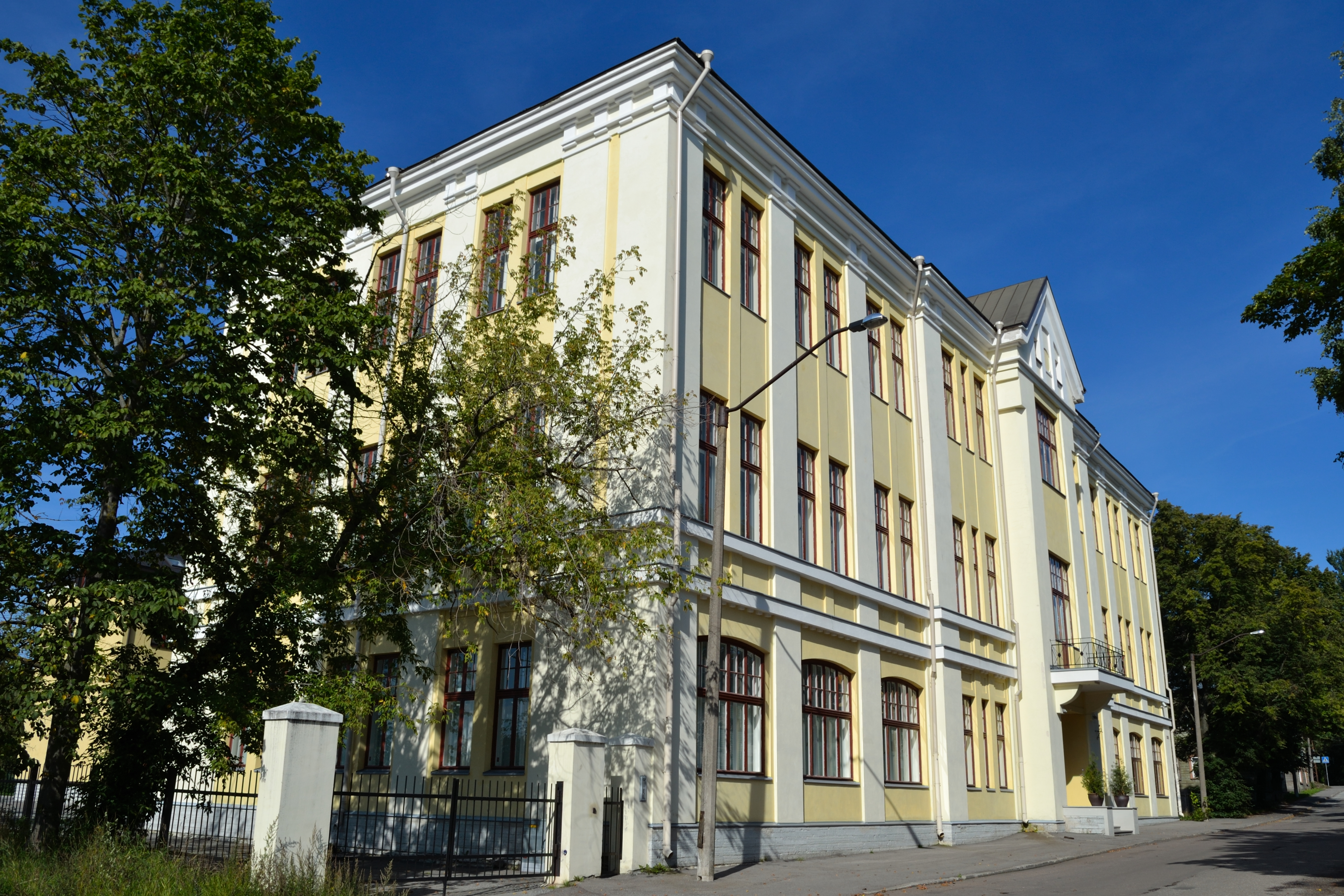
Bekker shipyard main building.

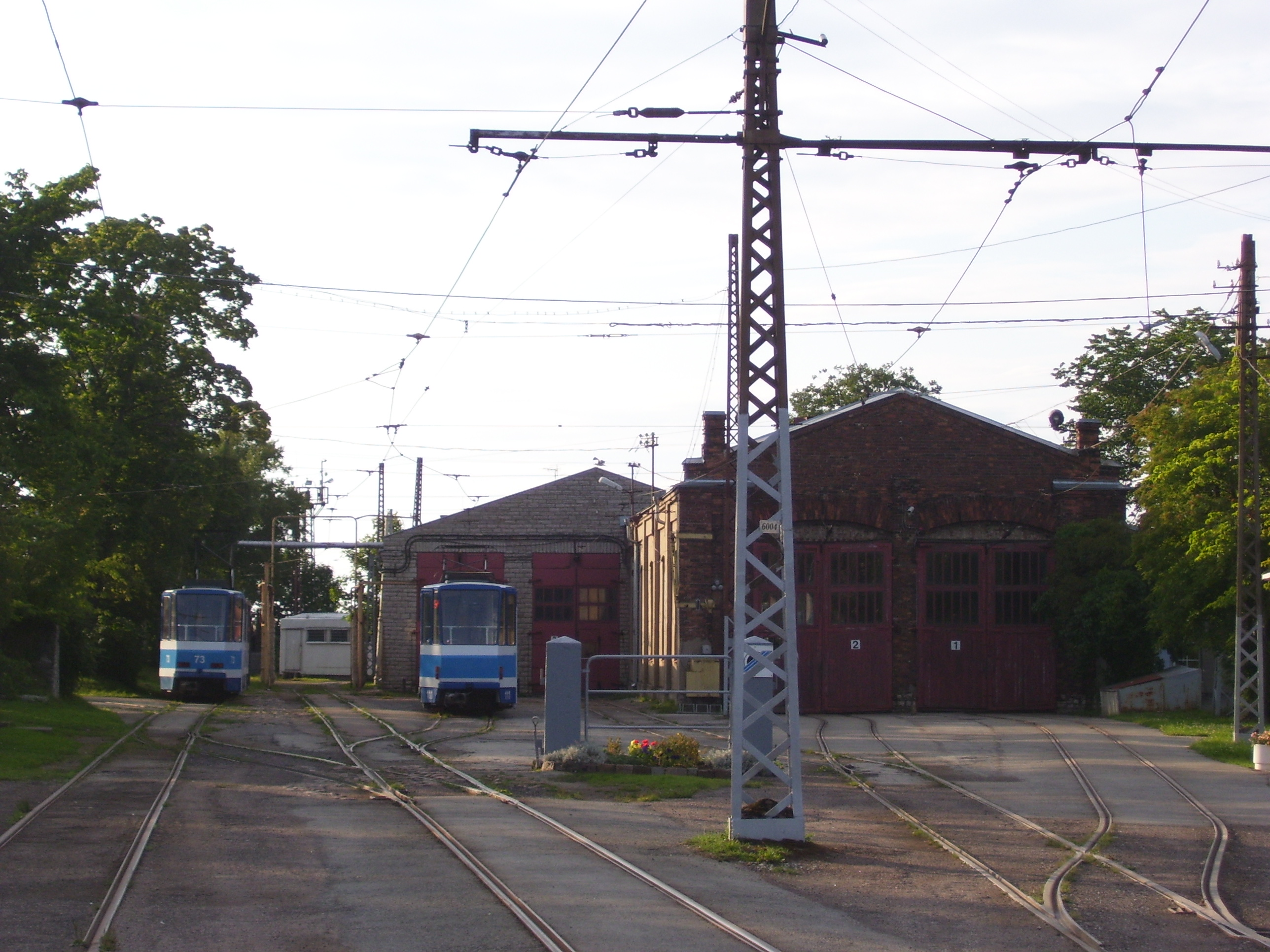
A tram depot in the end of Kopli.

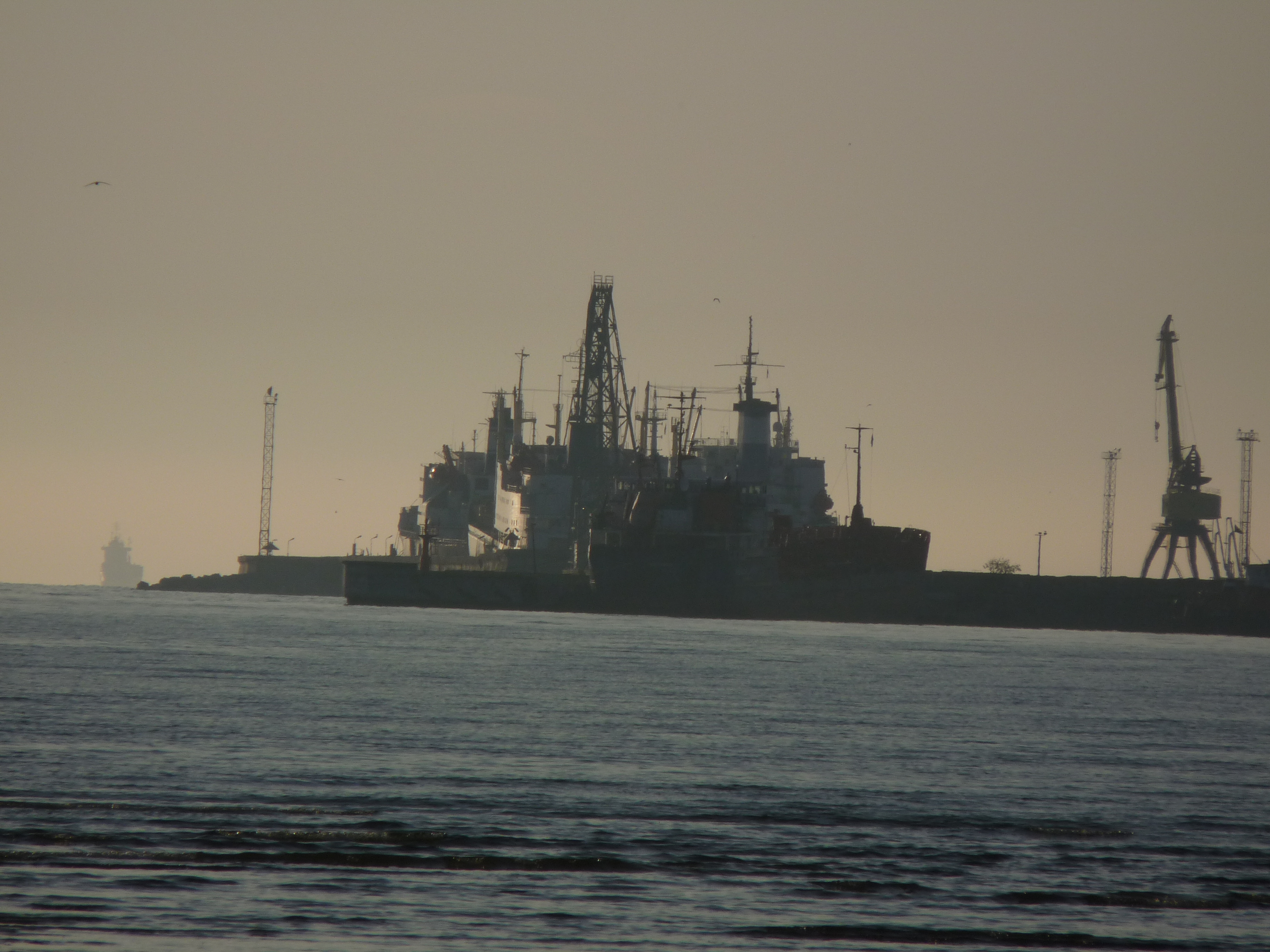
Bekker Port in Kopli seen from the Stroomi Beach in Pelguranna.

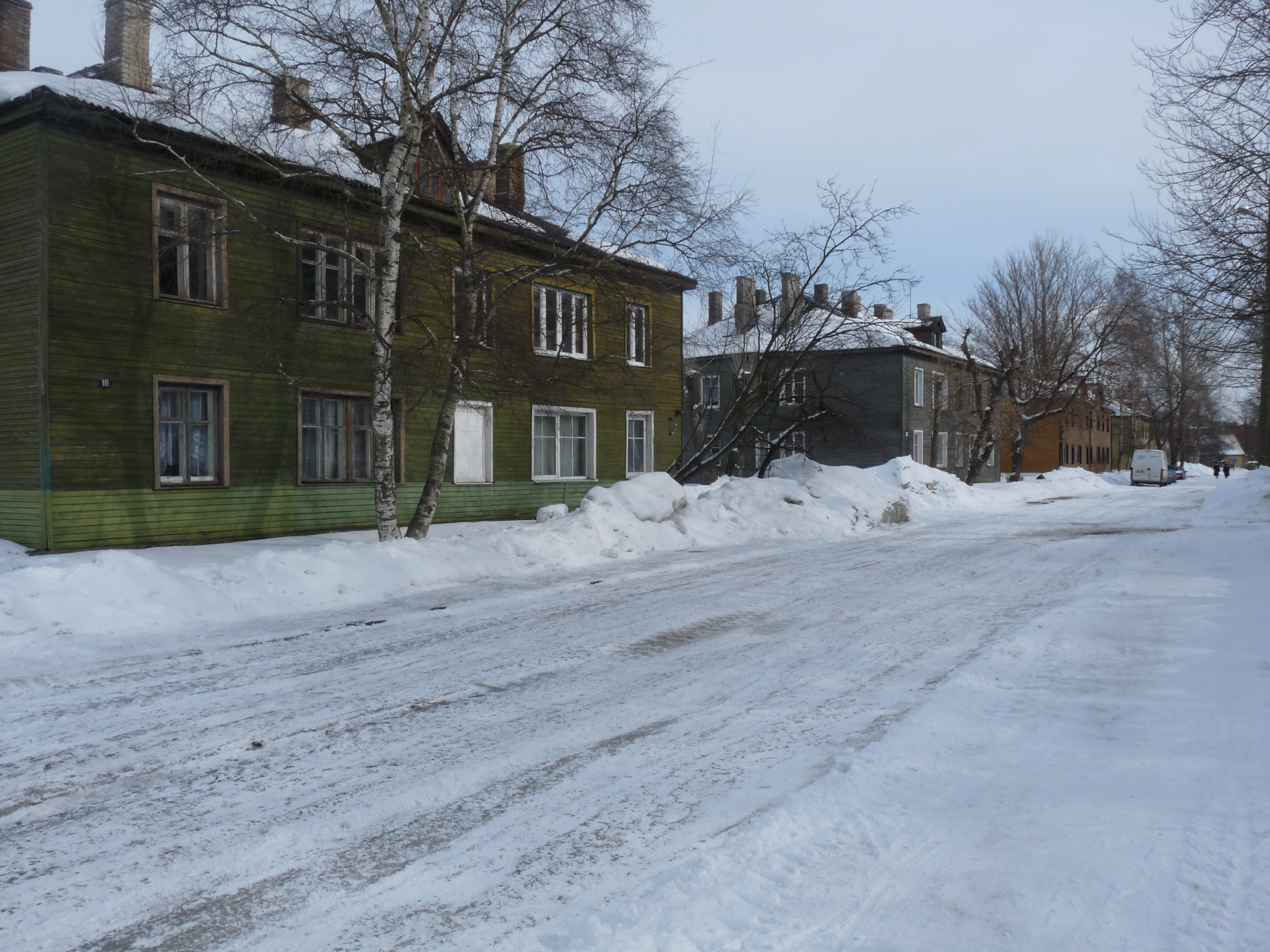
Old wooden houses

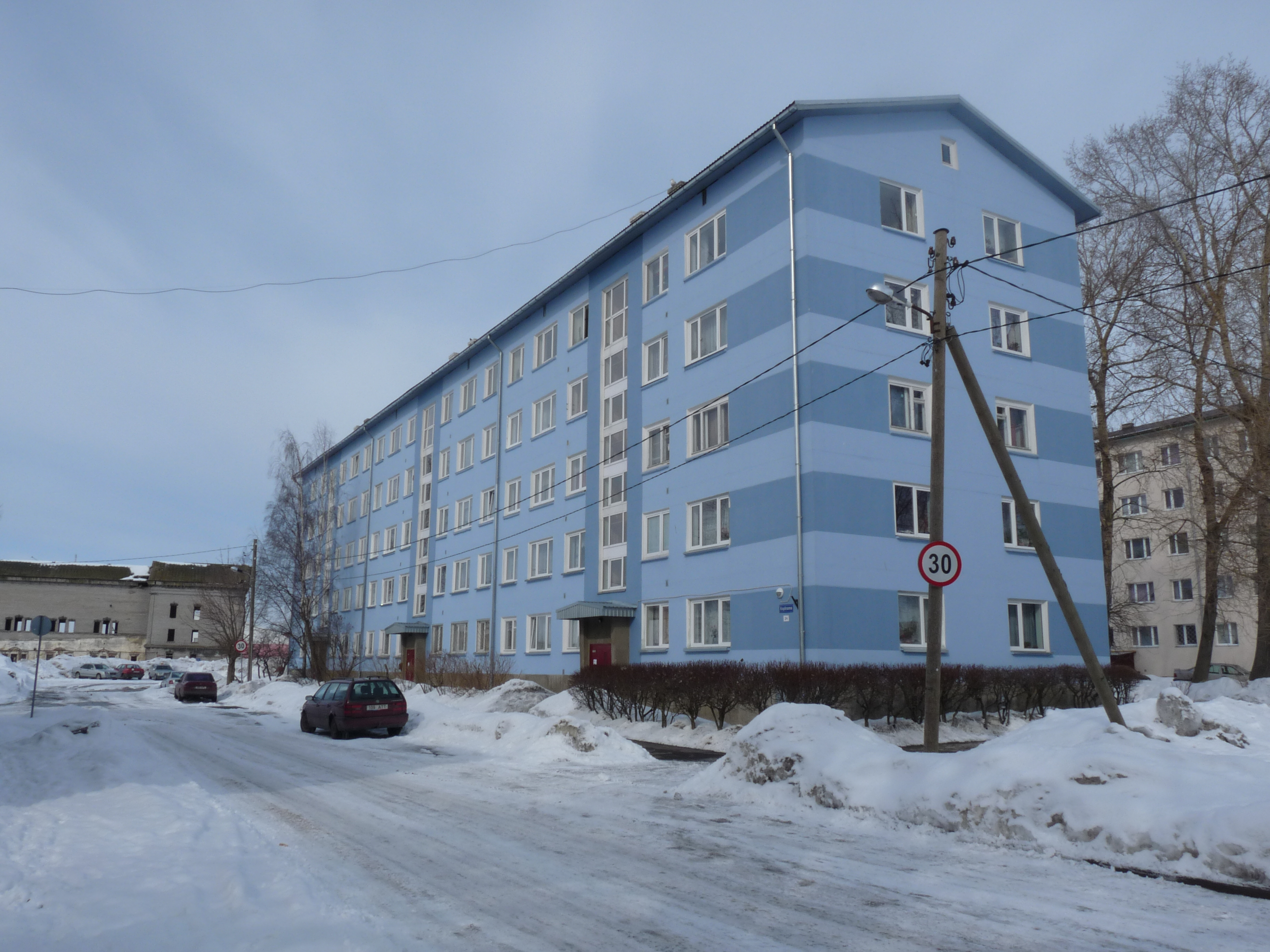
Renovated Soviet era 5-storey apartment building (khrushchyovka)

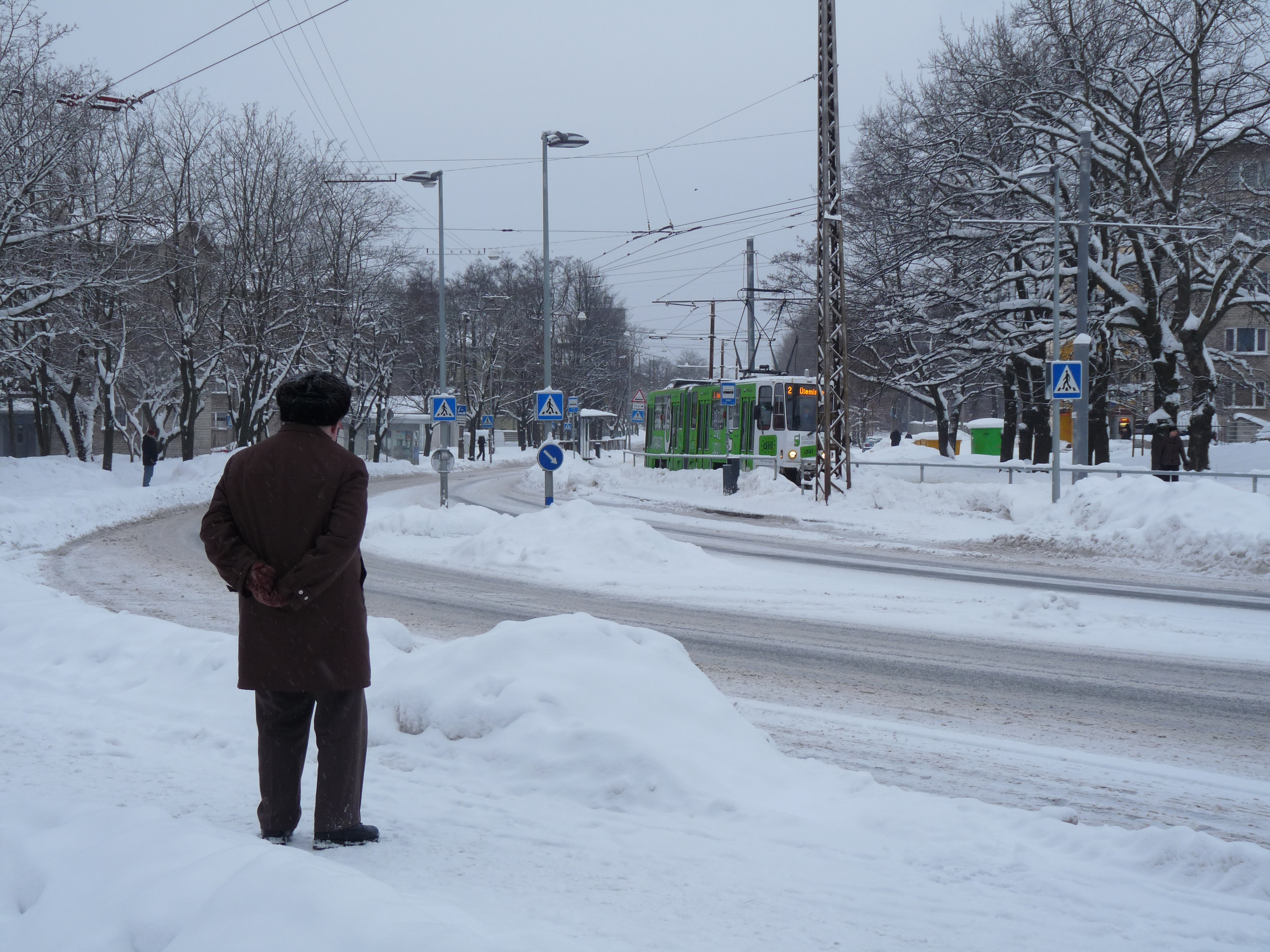
Streetview in winter

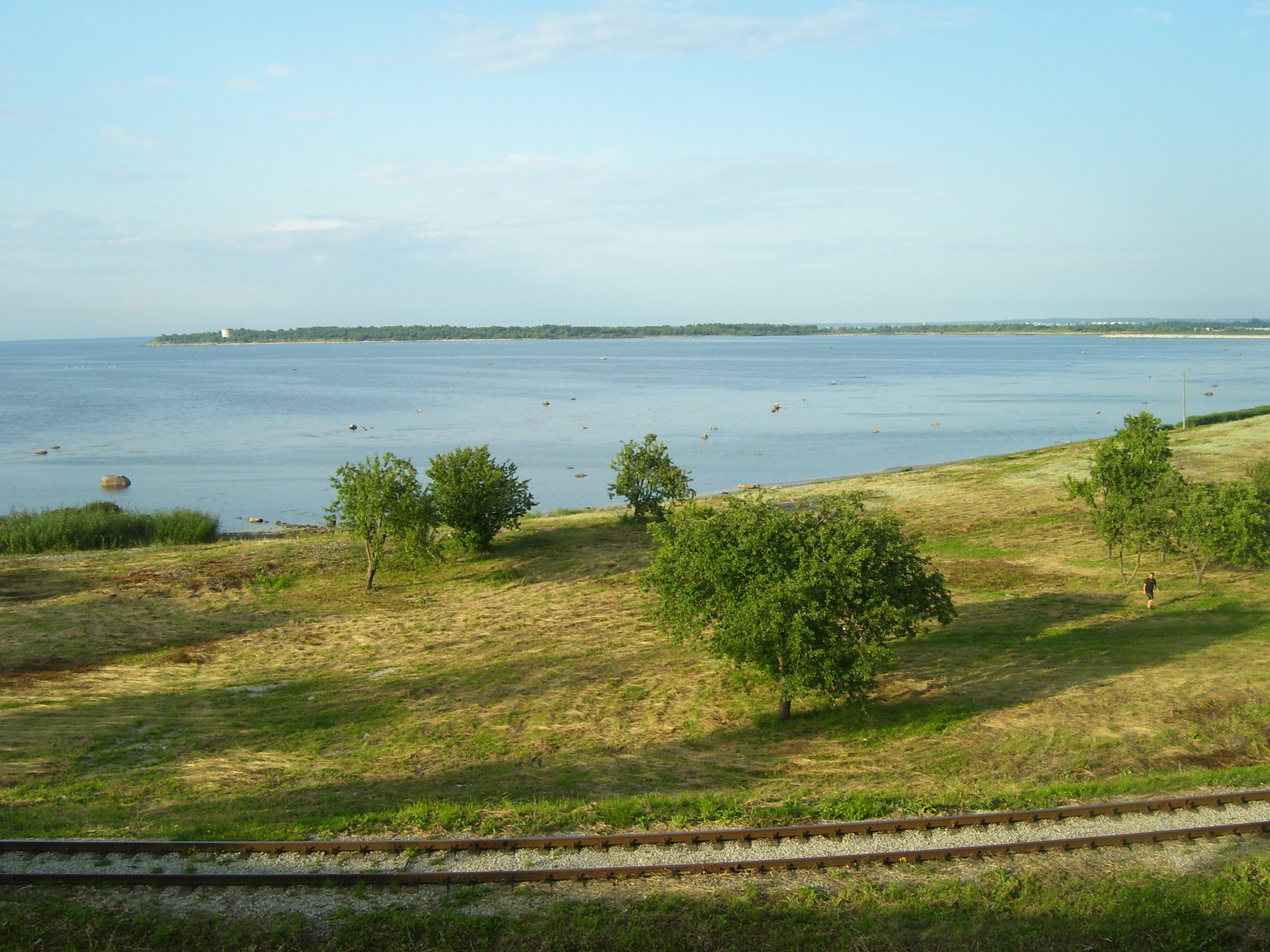
Paljassaare Bay

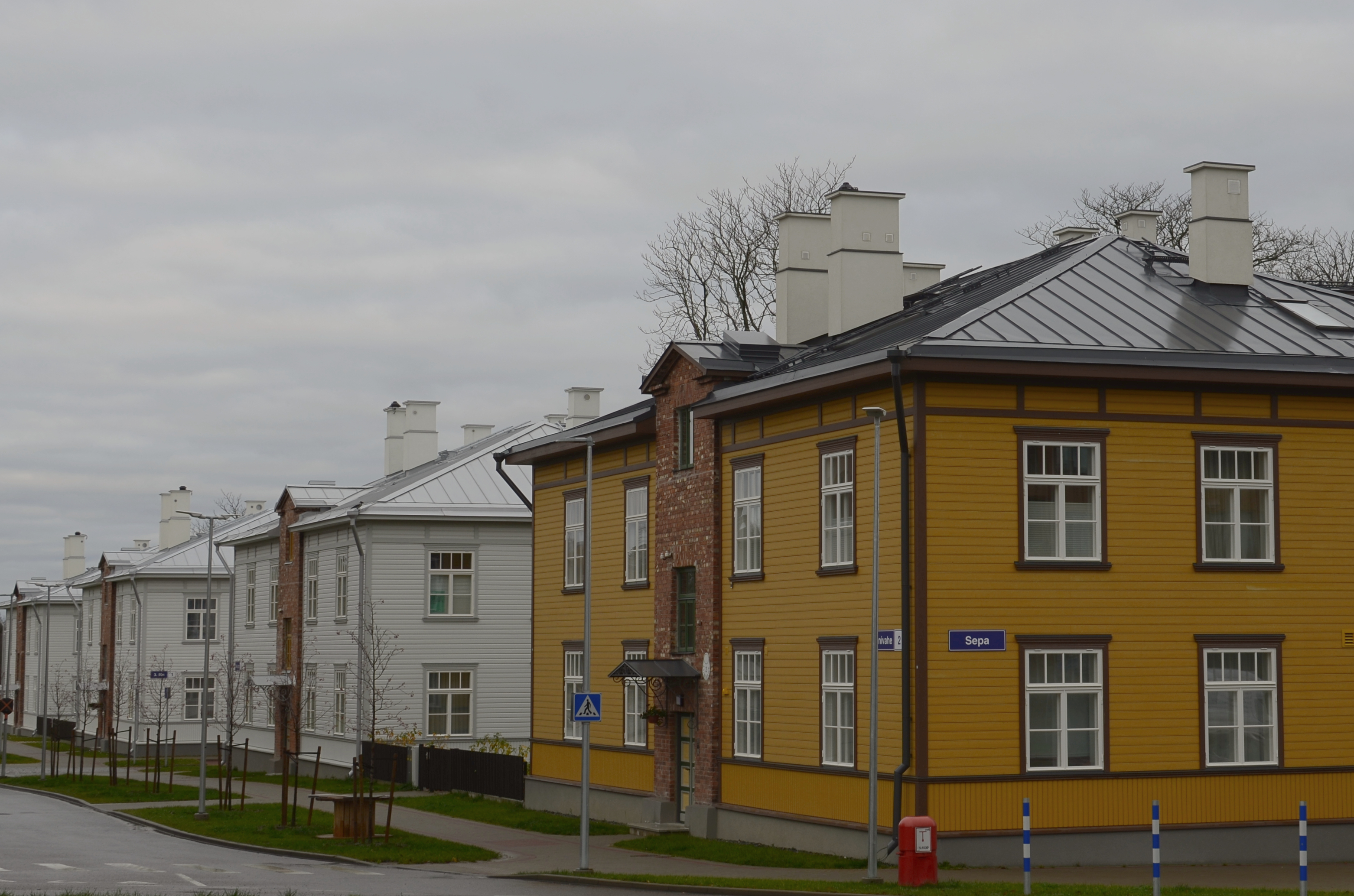
Newly reconstructed buildings in Kopli liinid
