= Lake Kubija =

Lake in Estonia

- Kubija järv (Estonian)
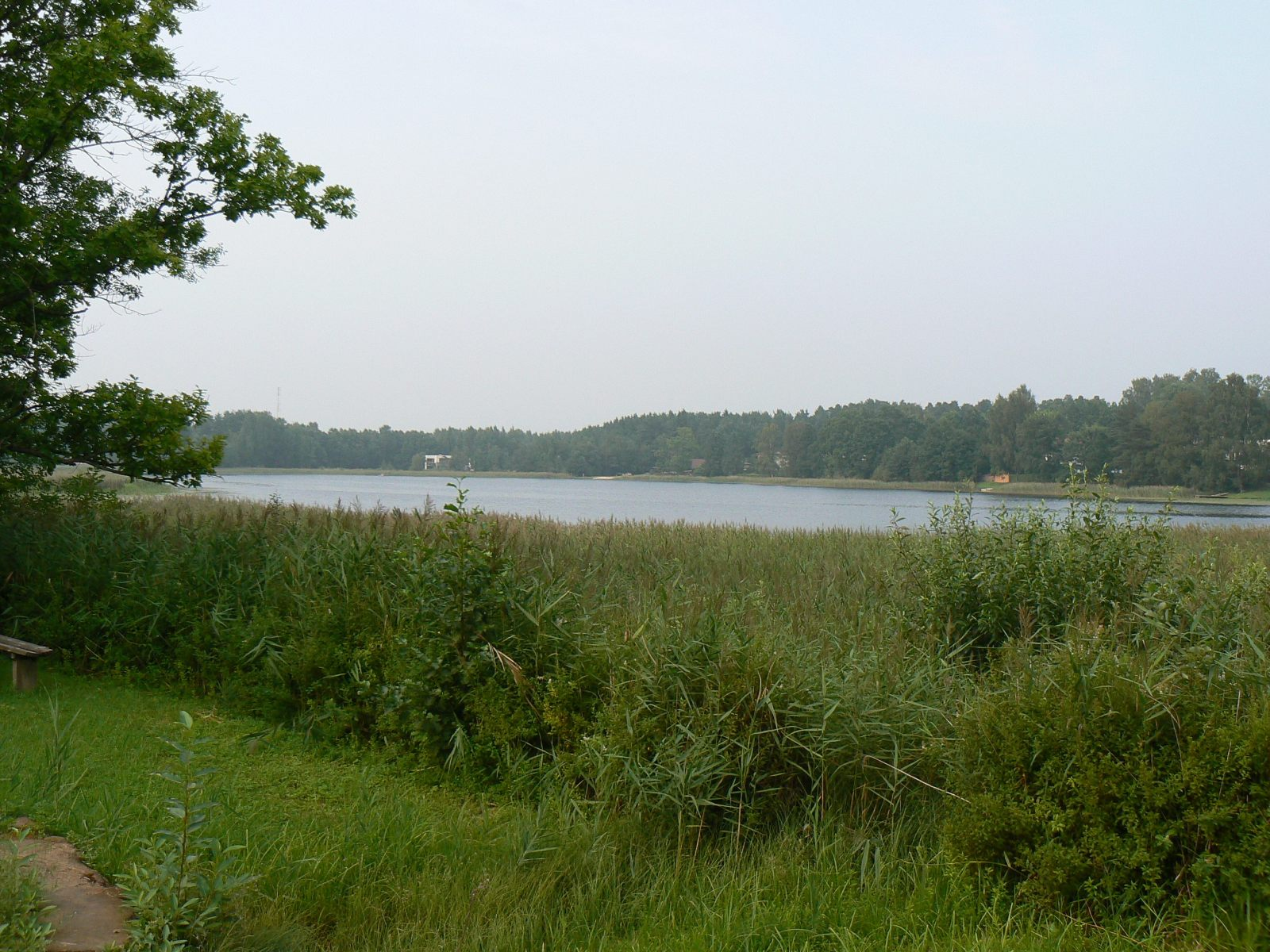

- Location within Estonia
- Coordinates: 57°48′54″N 27°00′00″E
- Basin countries: Estonia
- Max. length: 990 meters (3,250 ft)
- Max. width: 210 meters (690 ft)
- Surface area: 16.5 hectares (41 acres)
- Average depth: 2.5 meters (8 ft 2 in)
- Max. depth: 5.0 meters (16.4 ft)
- Water volume: 340,000 cubic meters (12,000,000 cu ft)
- Shore length^{1}: 2,520 meters (8,270 ft)
- Surface elevation: 73.1 meters (240 ft)
- ^{1} Shore length is not a well-defined measure.

Lake Kubija (Estonian: Kubija järv or Kubja järv) is a lake in Estonia. It is located in the town of Võru in Võru Parish, Võru County.

== Physical description ==
The lake has an area of 16.5 hectares (41 acres). The lake has an average depth of 2.5 meters (8 ft 2 in) and a maximum depth of 5.0 meters (16.4 ft). It is 990 meters (3,250 ft) long, and its shoreline measures 2,520 meters (8,270 ft). It has a volume of 340,000 cubic meters (12,000,000 cu ft).

== See also ==
- List of lakes of Estonia
