= Port of Tallinn =

Biggest port authority in Estonia

Port of Tallinn Tallinna Sadam
- Company type: Public company
- Traded as: Tallinn: TSM1T
- ISIN: EE3100021635
- Industry: Port authority
- Founded: 1992
- Headquarters: Tallinn, Estonia
- Number of locations: 5
- Key people: Valdo Kalm (CEO)
- Revenue: ▲€130.5 million (2019)
- Net income: ▲€44.4 million (2019)
- Number of employees: 265 (2014)
- Website: www.portoftallinn.com

Port of Tallinn (Estonian: Tallinna Sadam) is the biggest port authority in Estonia. Taking into account both cargo and passenger traffic, it is one of the largest port enterprises of the Baltic Sea.

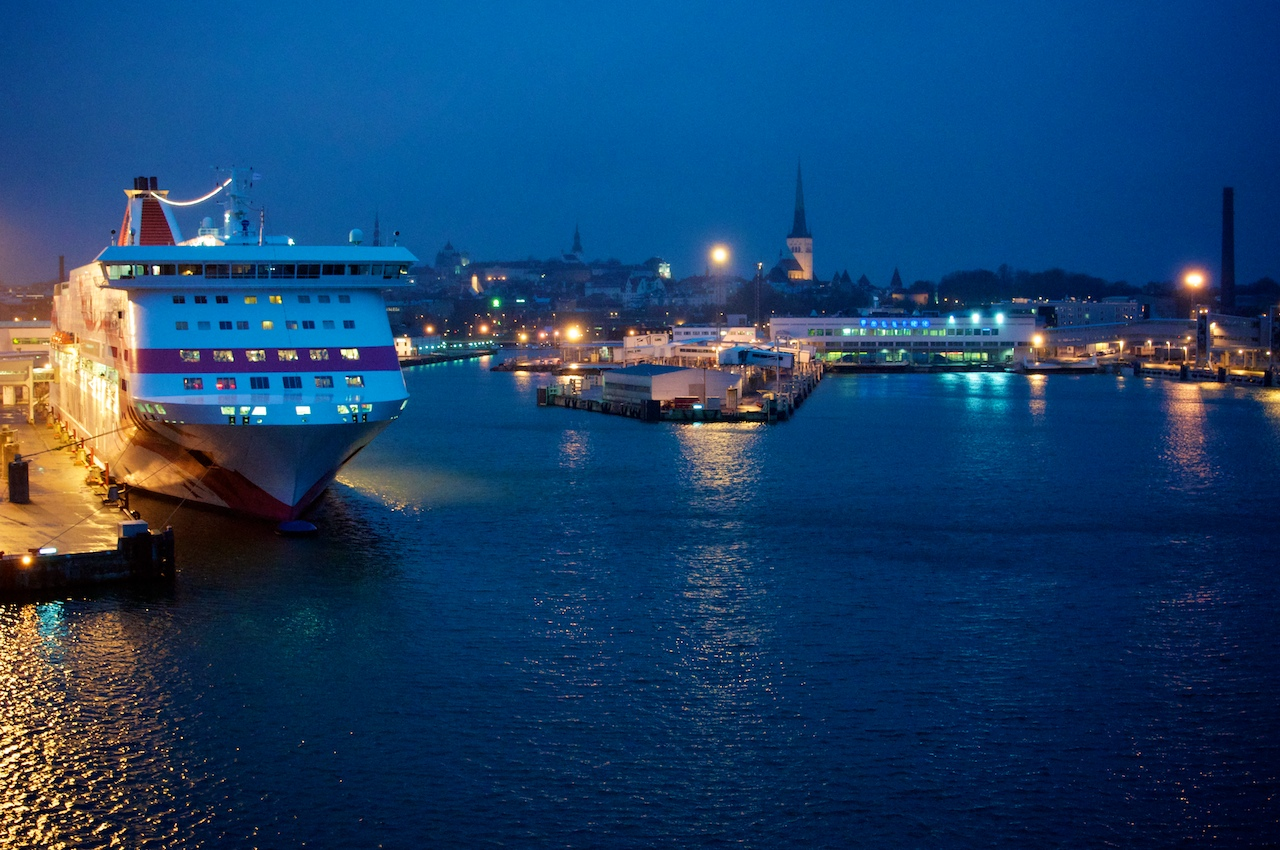
Port seen in the morning in 2010.

Port of Tallinn is a publicly listed company managing five constituent ports (two of them in Tallinn):

- Tallinn Passenger Port / Old City Harbour (Vanasadam) – the main passenger harbour in Estonia; located in the centre of Tallinn; one of the busiest passenger ports of the Baltic Sea
- Muuga Harbour – the largest cargo harbour in Estonia, located in Maardu, 13 km northeast of Tallinn city centre
- Paldiski South Harbour – a cargo harbour in Paldiski, 40 km west from Tallinn
- Paljassaare Harbour – a small cargo harbour a few kilometres northwest of Tallinn city centre in Paljassaare
- Saaremaa Harbour – a passenger harbour on the island of Saaremaa, in Ninase

In October 2016, the Port of Tallinn subsidiary TS Laevad took over operation of the ferry routes between the Estonian mainland and the islands of Saaremaa and Hiiumaa.

Under the subsidiary, TS Shipping, the Port of Tallinn owns and operates icebreaker MSV Botnica.

On 29 September 2017, at the EU Digital Summit in Tallinn, a partnership of Ericsson, Intel and Telia Estonia announced that they had implemented the first live public 5G network in Europe at the Tallinn Passenger Port to connect with Tallink cruise ships at the port.

In 2018, the company was listed in the Tallinn Stock Exchange. It was the first time in nearly 20 years in Estonia when a state-owned company went public in Estonia. It was also the 2nd largest IPO in Nasdaq Tallinn in the number of retail investors participating. The Republic of Estonia remains as the largest shareholder and holds 67% of the company.

== Statistics ==
Annual passenger statistics for Tallinn Passenger Port
Year	Total passengers
2001	5,739,573
2002	5,944,942
2003	5,862,485
2004	6,737,926
2005	7,007,558
2006	6,760,149
2007	6,514,294
2008	7,247,366
2009	7,257,646
2010	7,915,113
2011	8,478,929
2012	8,841,679
2013	9,236,429
2014	9,569,313
2015	9,793,049
2016	10,173,297
2017	10,560,000
2018	10,619,000
2019	10,639,000
2020	4,333,000
2021	3,665,759
2022	7,213,655
2023	8,080,796
2024	8,362,574

== See also ==
- Ports of the Baltic Sea
