= Tallinn Bay =

Bay in Estonia

Coordinates: 59°31′8″N 24°40′6″E

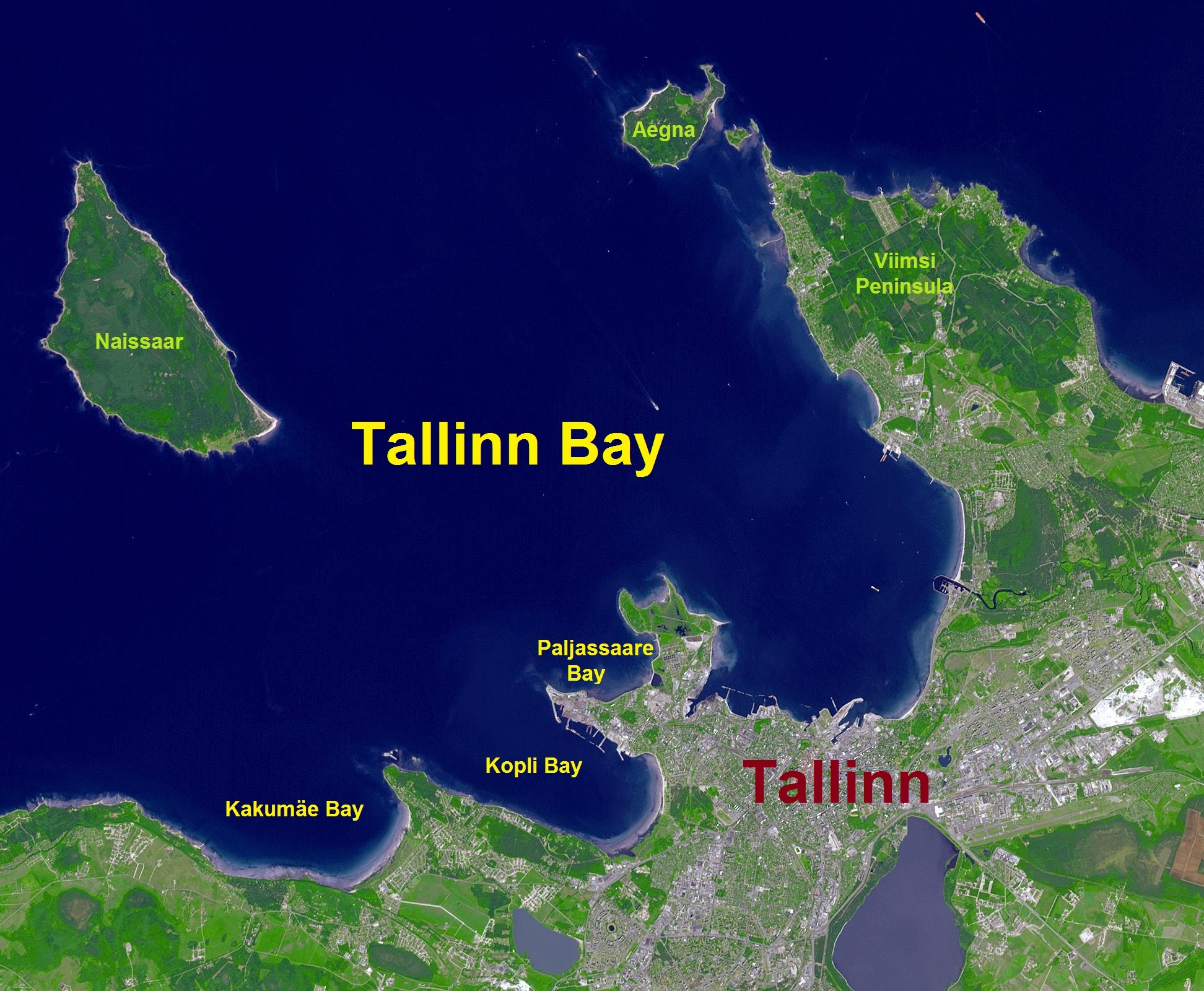
Parts of the Tallinn Bay

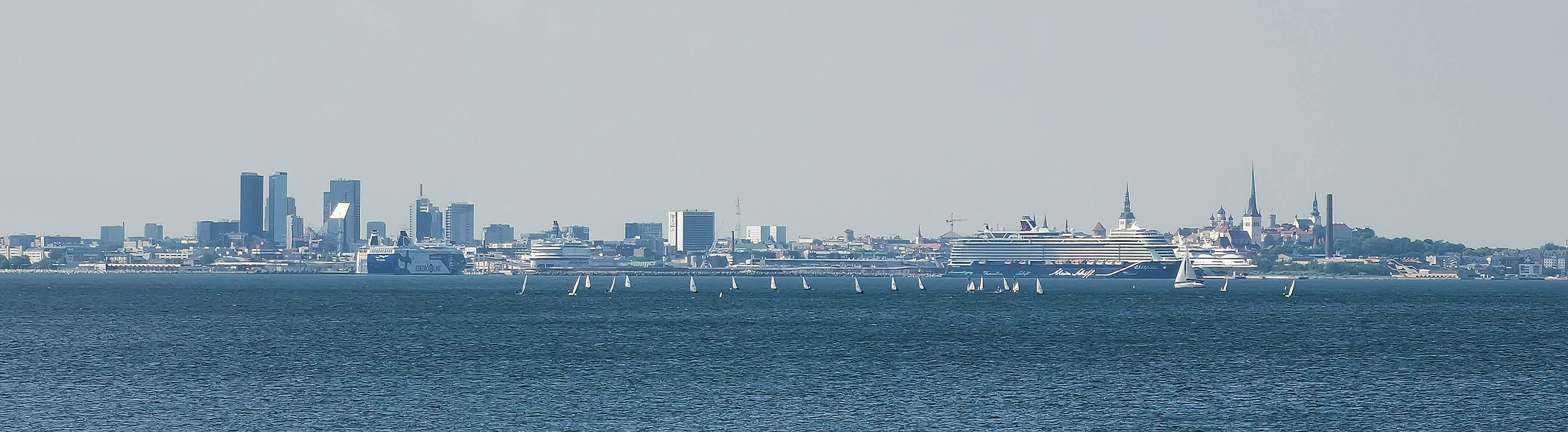
Tallinn Roadstead in 2021

Tallinn Bay (Estonian: Tallinna laht) is a bay in Estonia on the southern coast of the Gulf of Finland. The Estonian capital city Tallinn is located on the southern coast of the bay.

Tallinn Bay itself is divided into several parts: Tallinn Roadstead (Estonian: Tallinna reid), Kopli Bay, Kakumäe Bay and Paljassaare Bay. The islands Naissaar and Aegna border the bay in the north, the Viimsi Peninsula to the east.

The shore waters are shallow but become deep rapidly. Tallinn Bay has a steep slope, which allows for good water exchange with the waters of the Gulf of Finland. Tallinn Bay is one of the deepest bays in Estonia, max depth is about 100 m.

The Old Town is situated close to the sheltered Tallinn Bay, which is a natural harbour and the main passenger port. Paljassaare Harbour and Bekker Harbor by Kopli Bay are used for cargo traffic. There are four public beaches on the coastline: Pirita, Stroomi, Kakumäe, and Pikakari.

== History ==
In the Russo-Swedish War (1788–90) the roadstead became the site of a naval battle, in which the Swedish fleet suffered an unsuccessful attack on the Russian defence positions (see Battle of Reval).

== Gallery ==
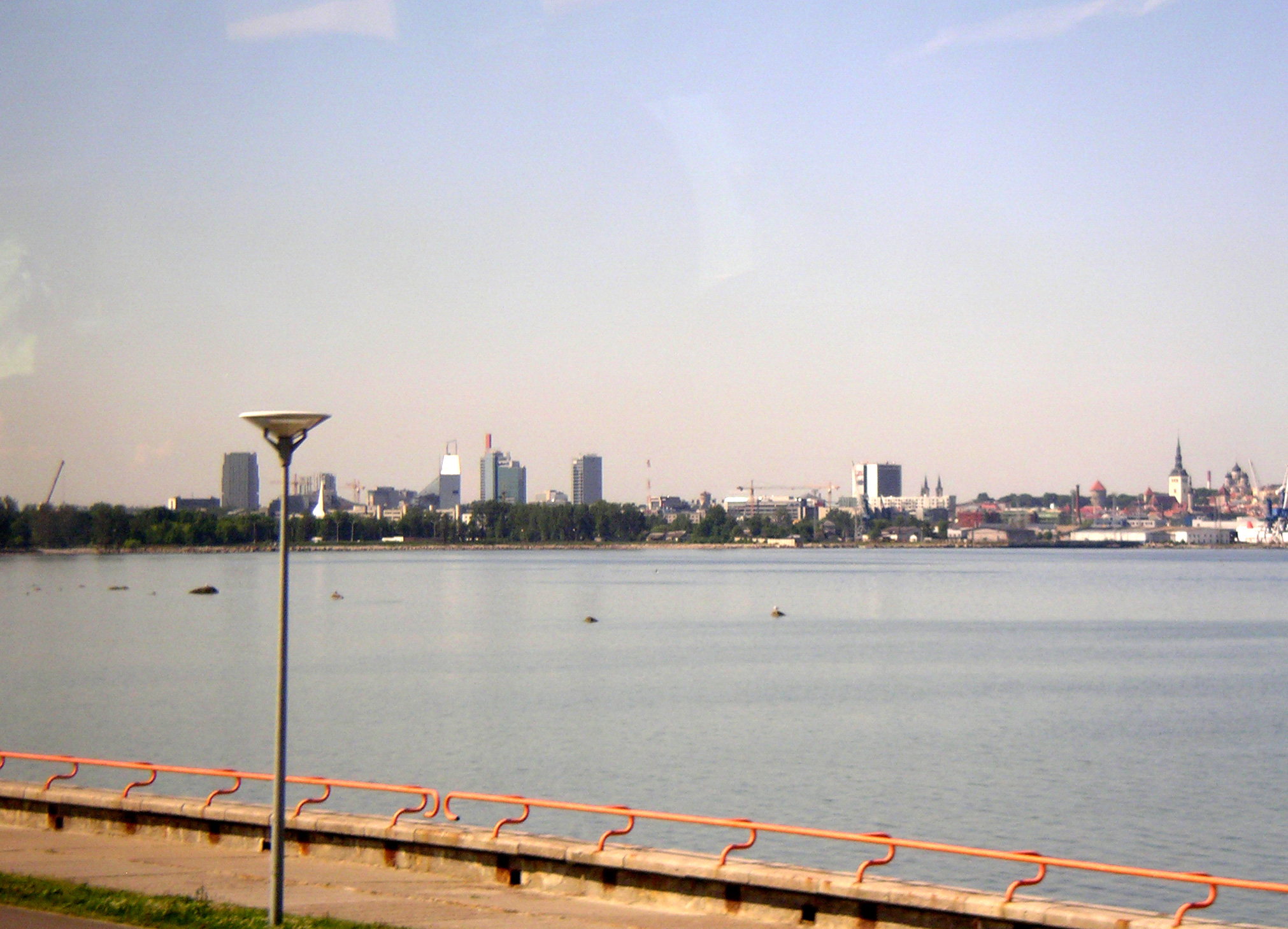
View at Tallinn city centre over the Tallinn Bay from Maarjamäe.

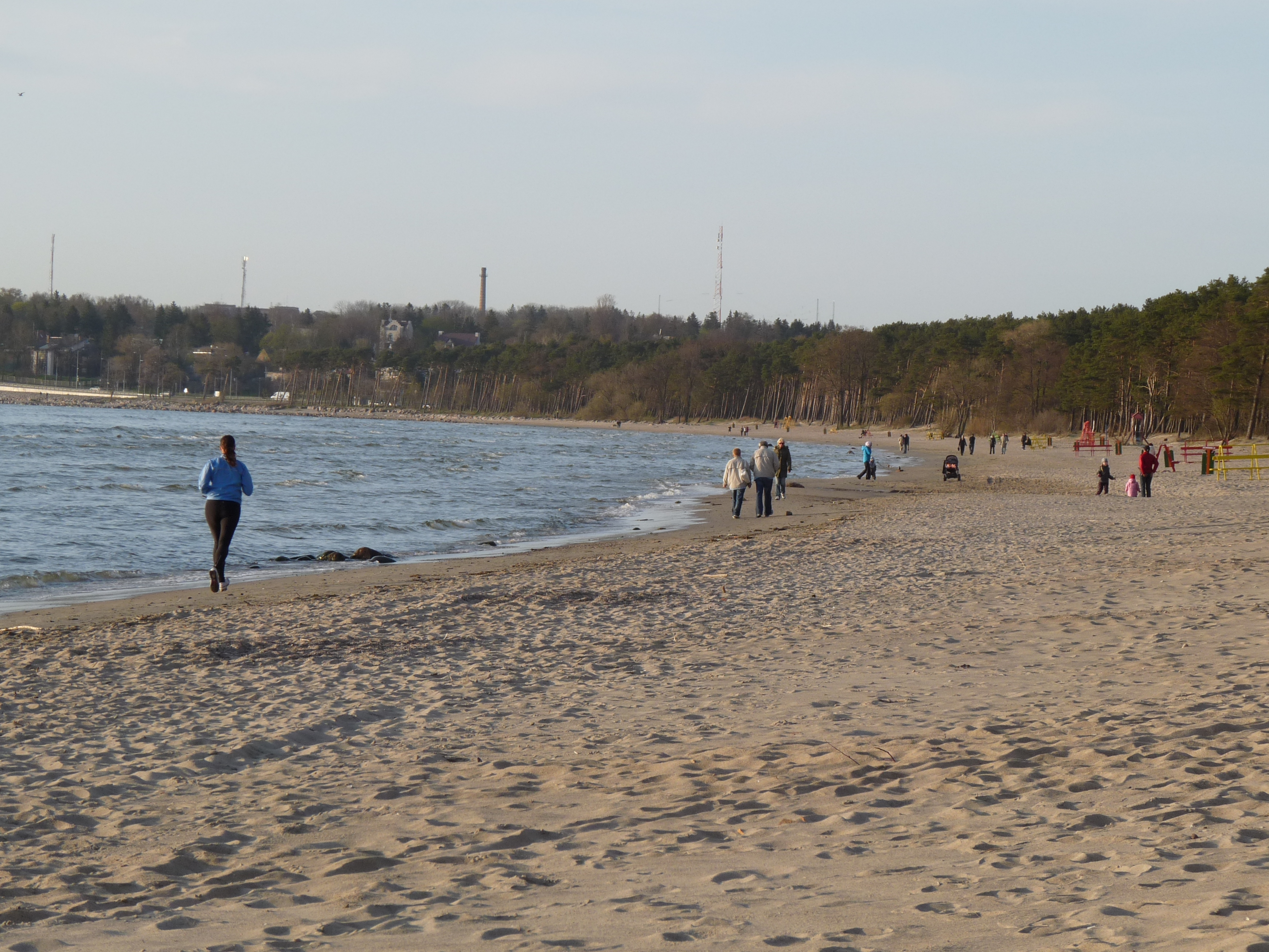
Pirita Beach

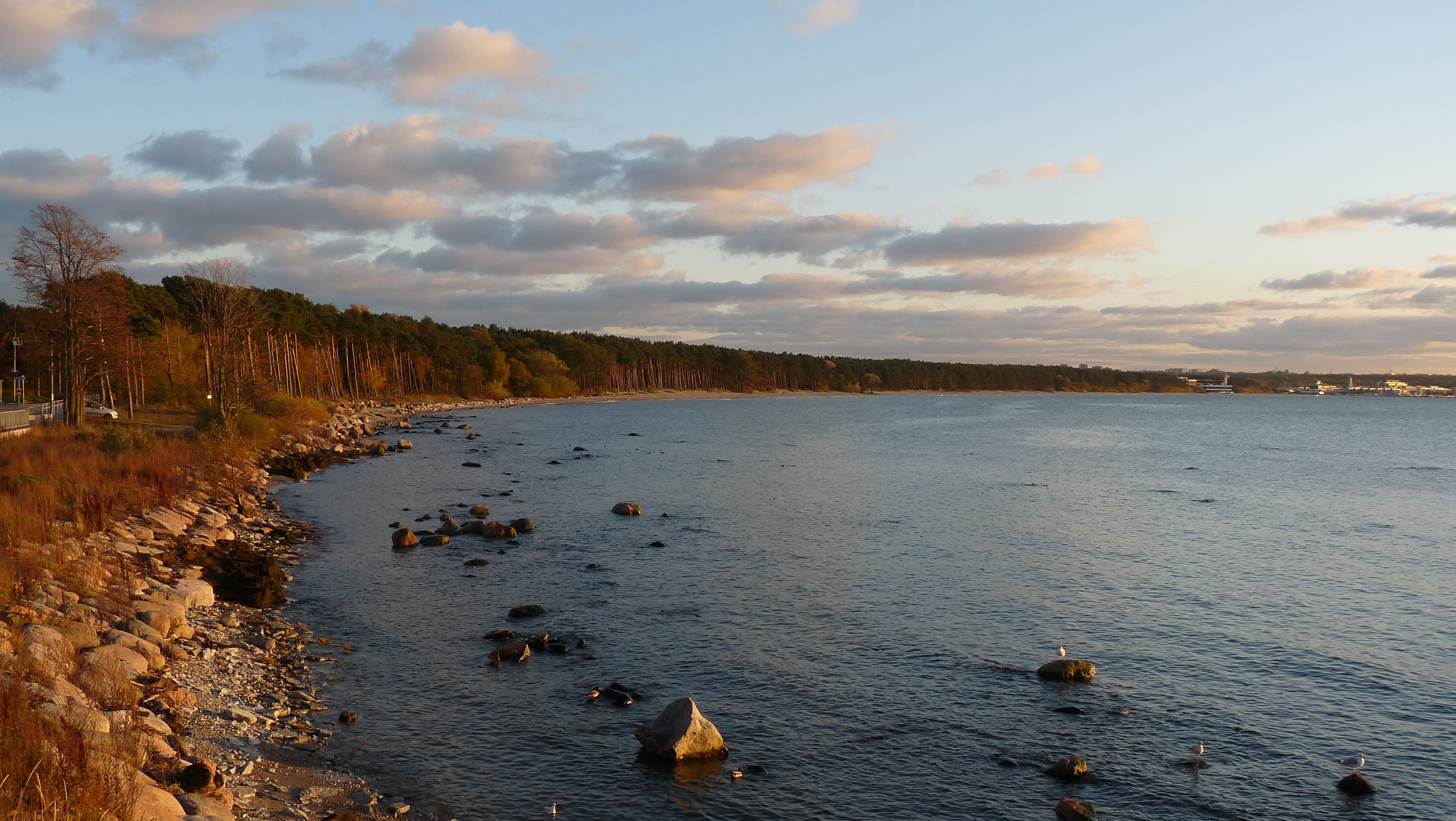
Coastline in Merivälja.

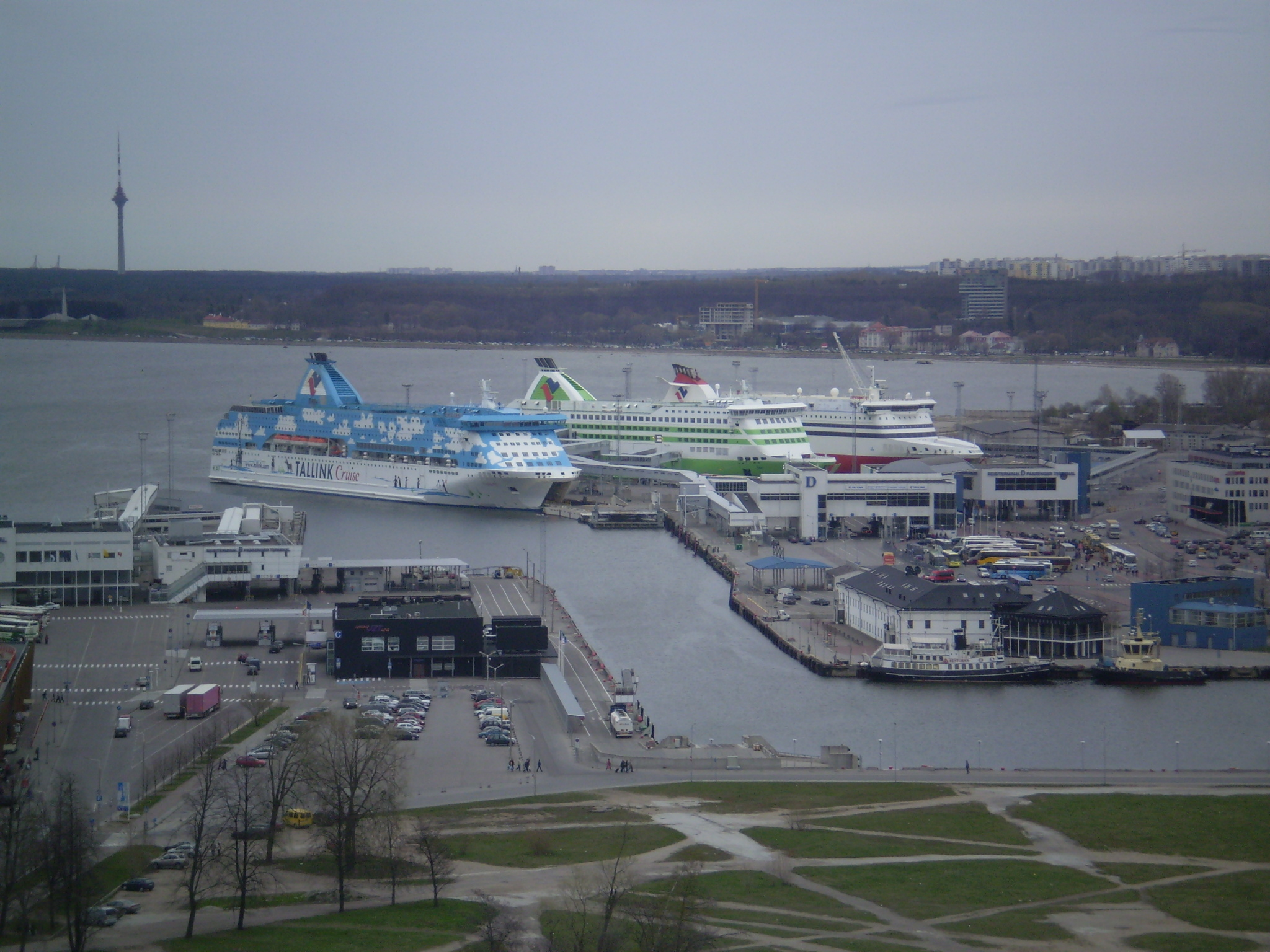
Tallinn Passenger Port

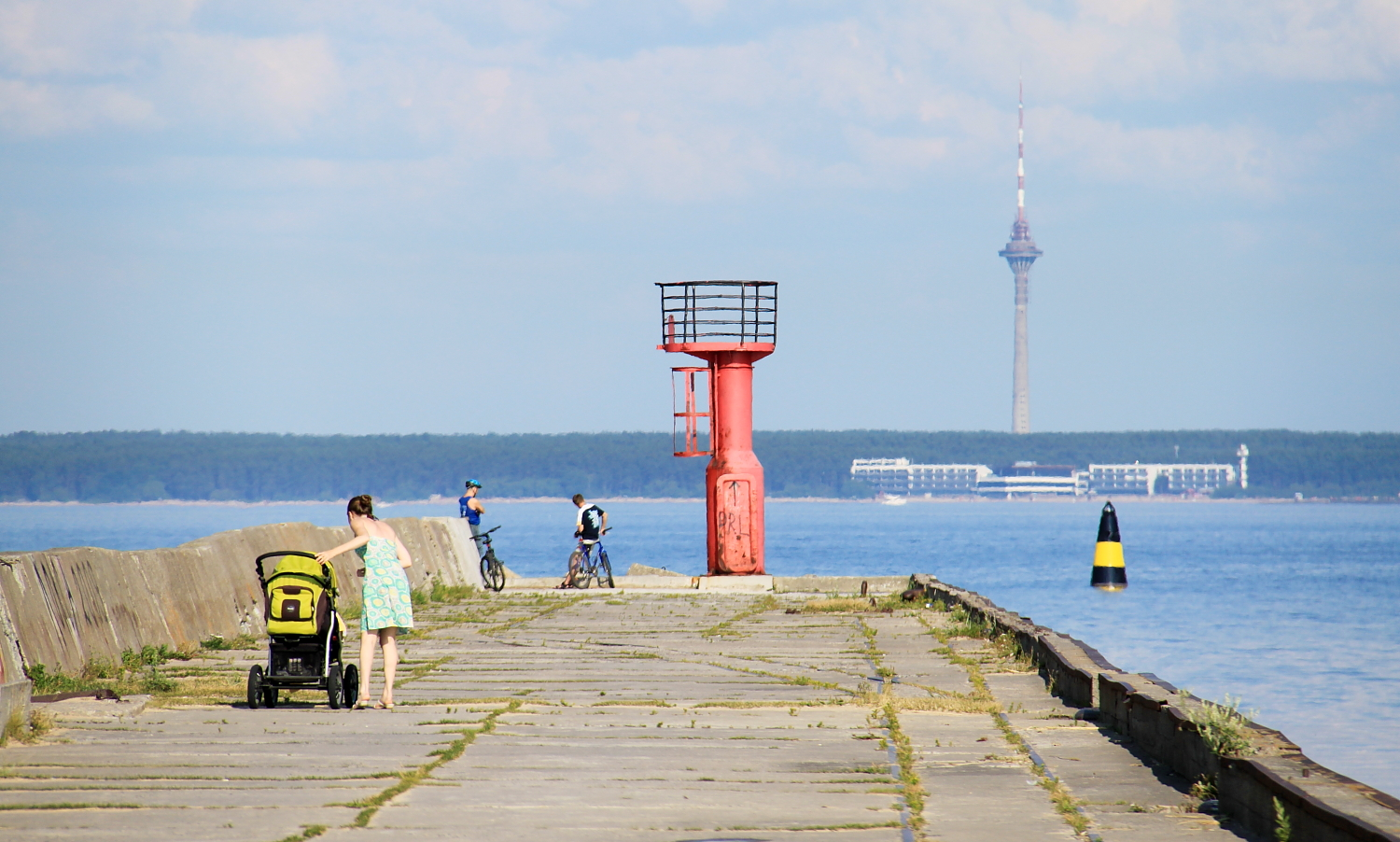
View from Paljassaare towards Pirita.

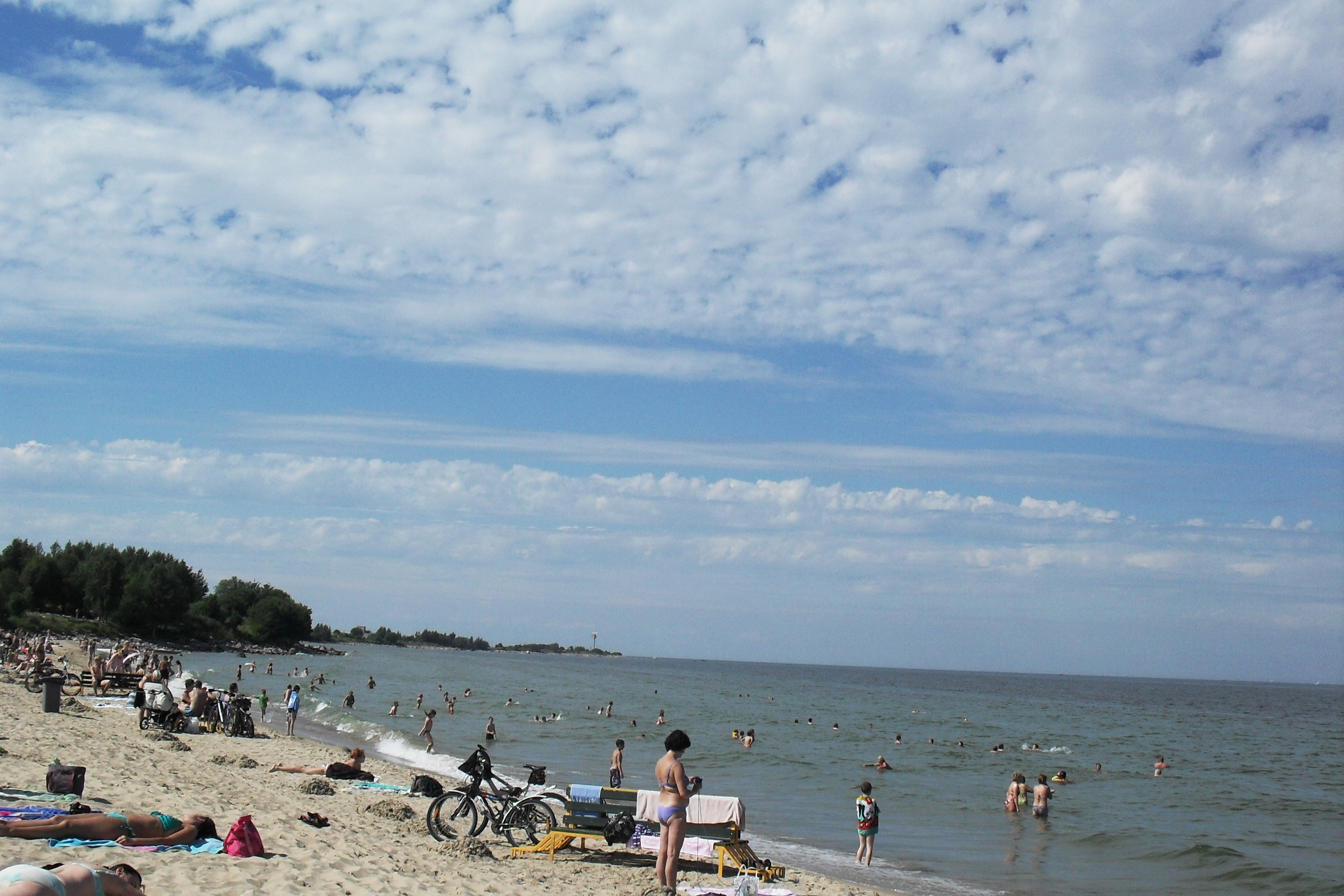
Pikakari Beach in Paljassaare.

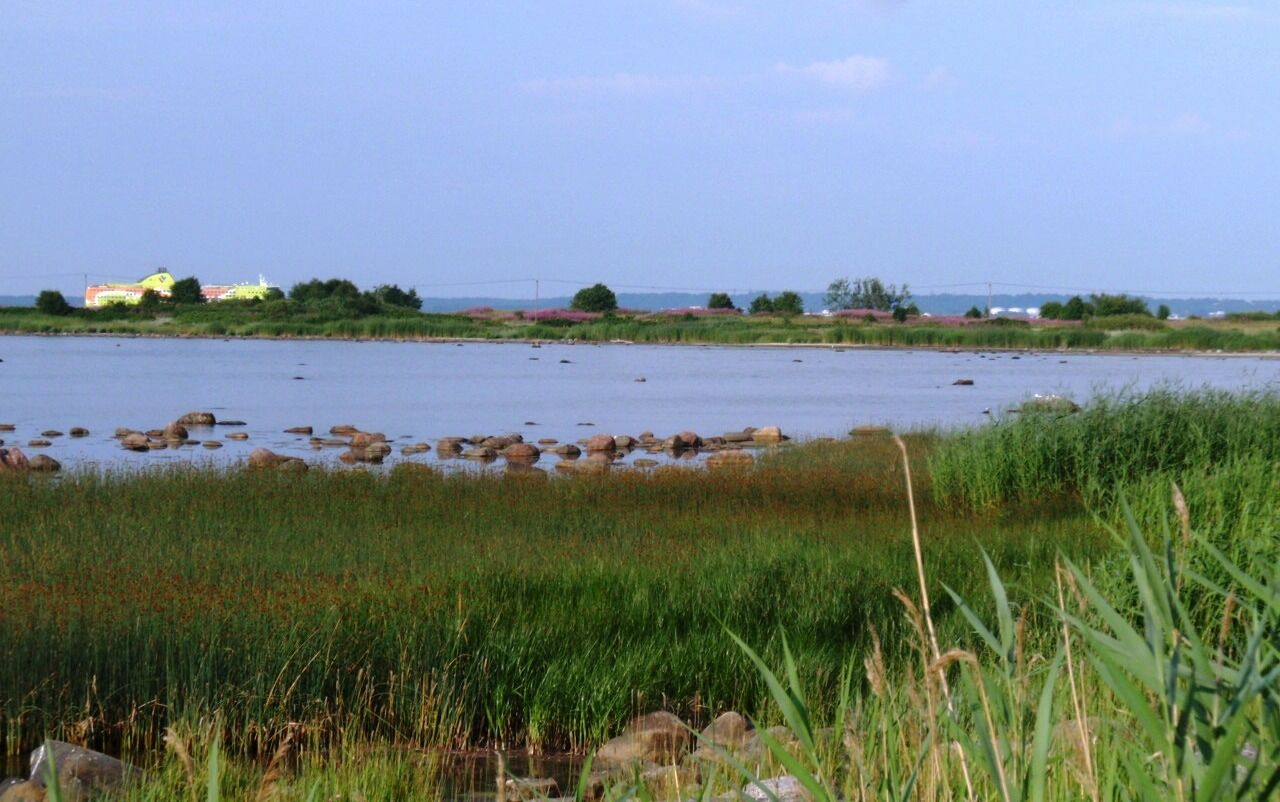
Paljasaare

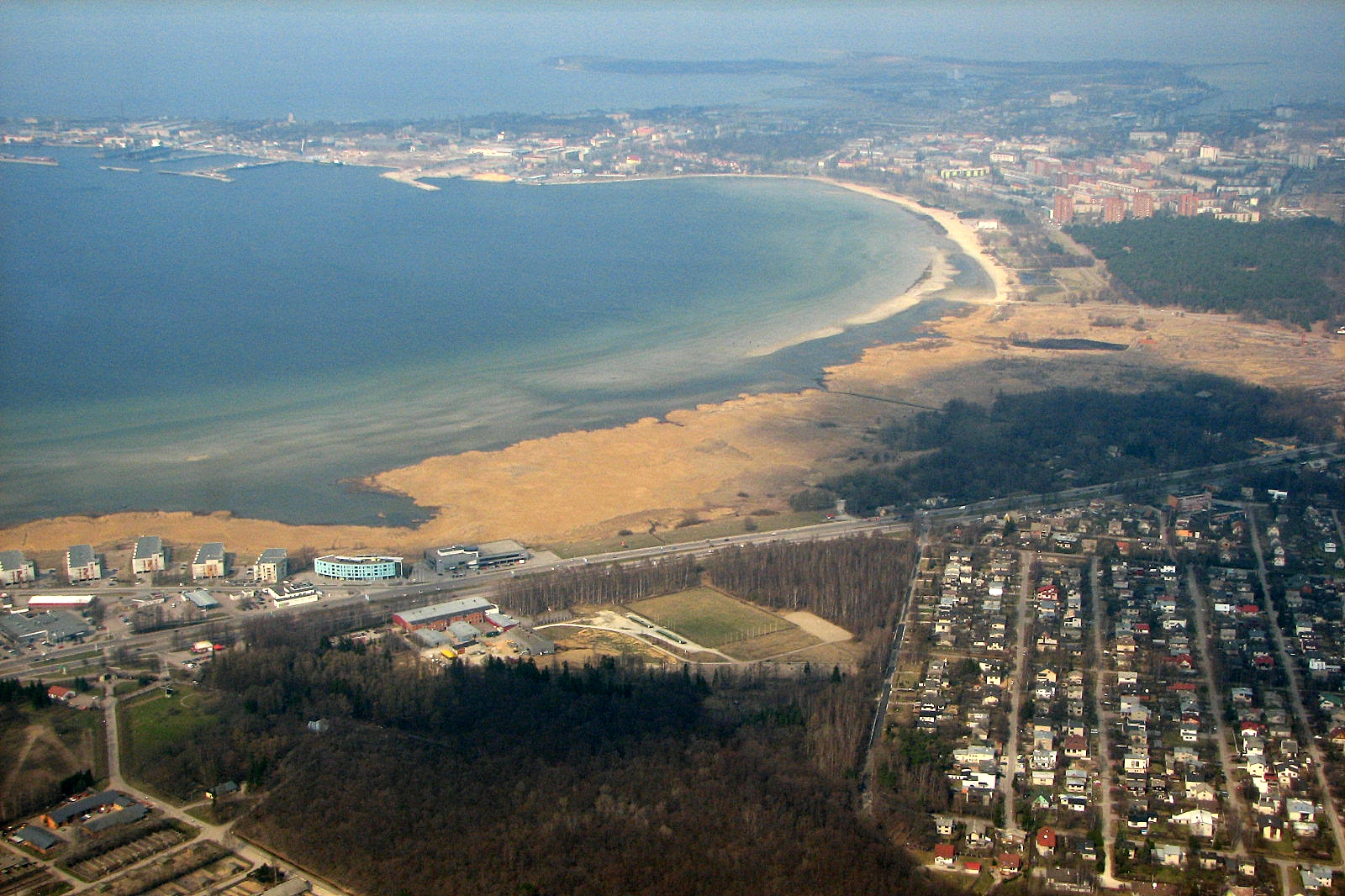
Kopli Bay

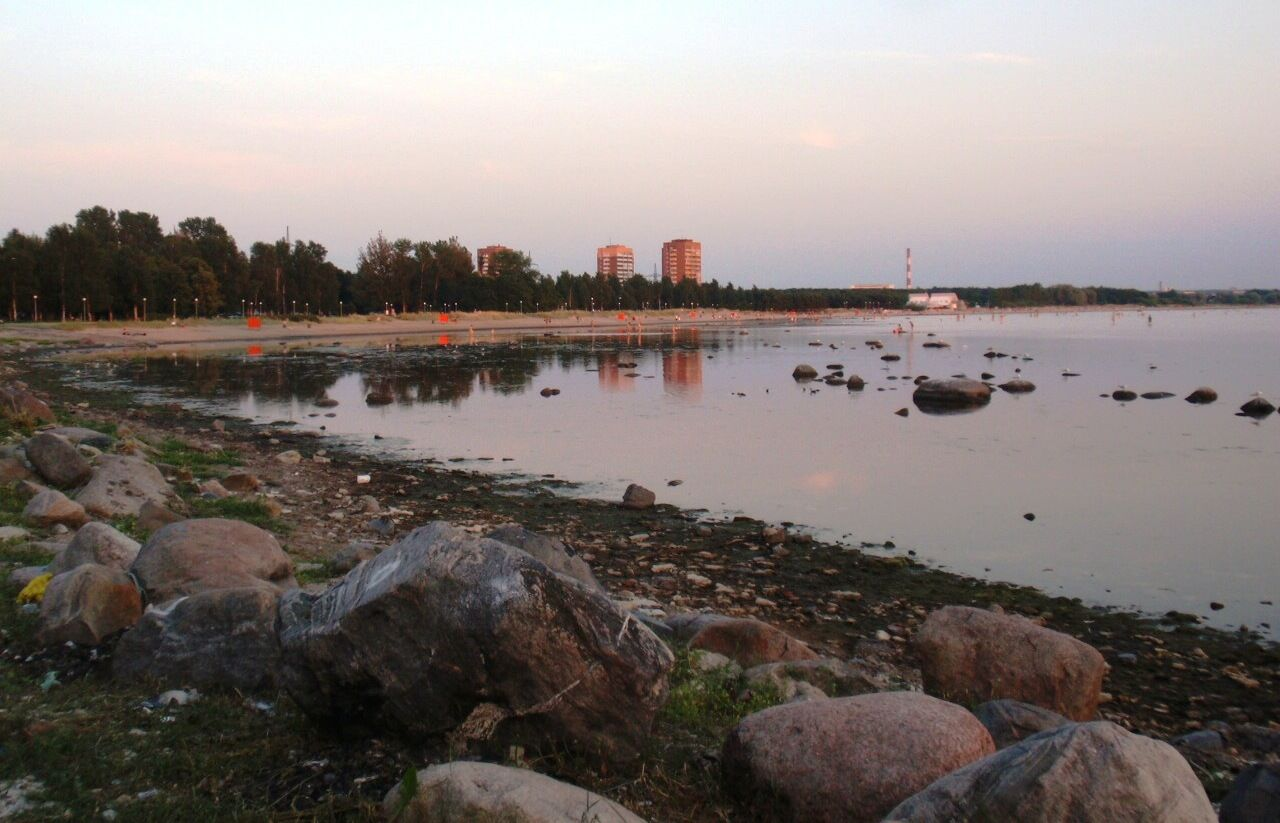
Stroomi Beach by the Kopli Bay in Pelguranna.

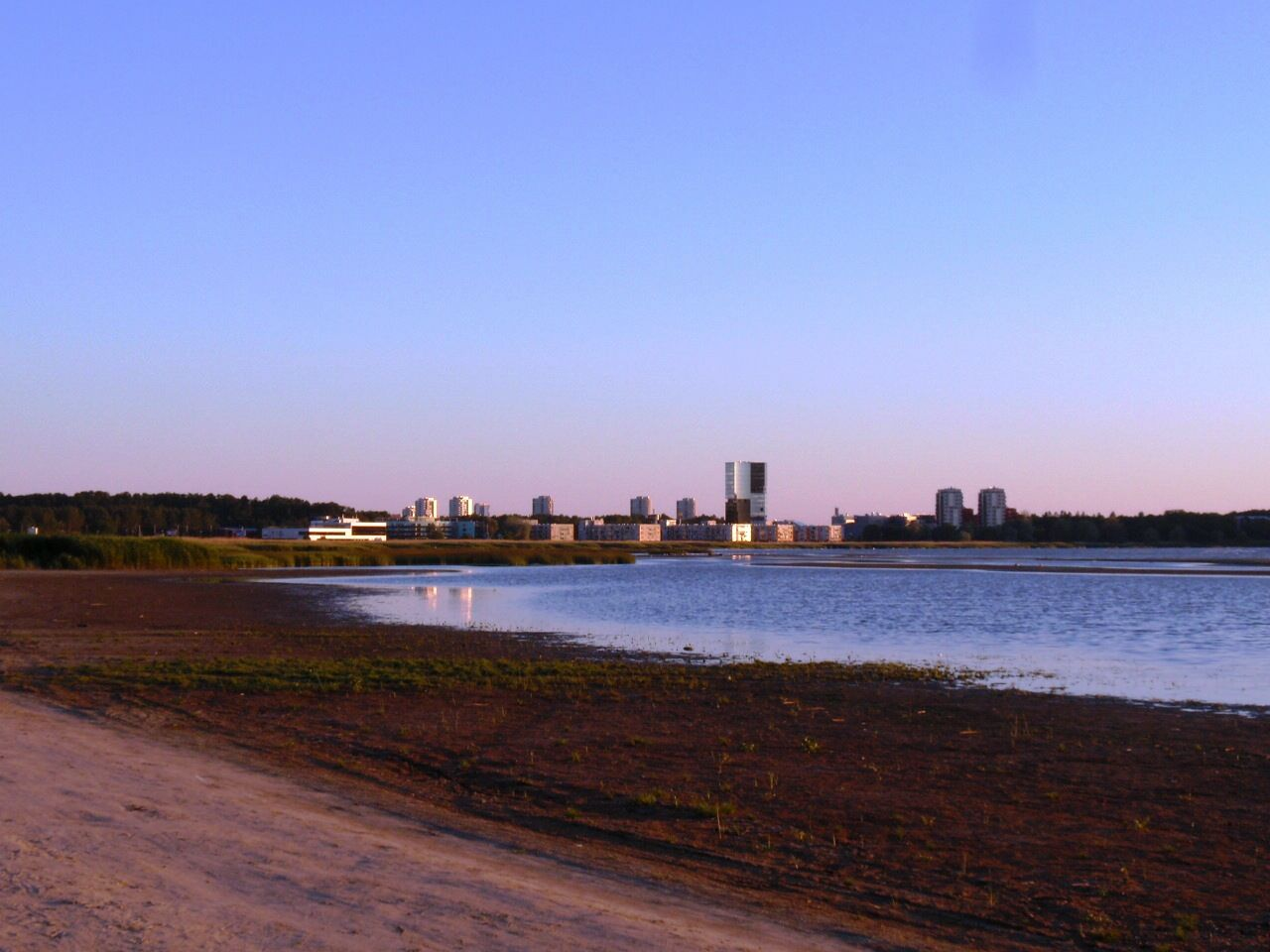
View from Stroomi Beach to Väike-Õismäe.

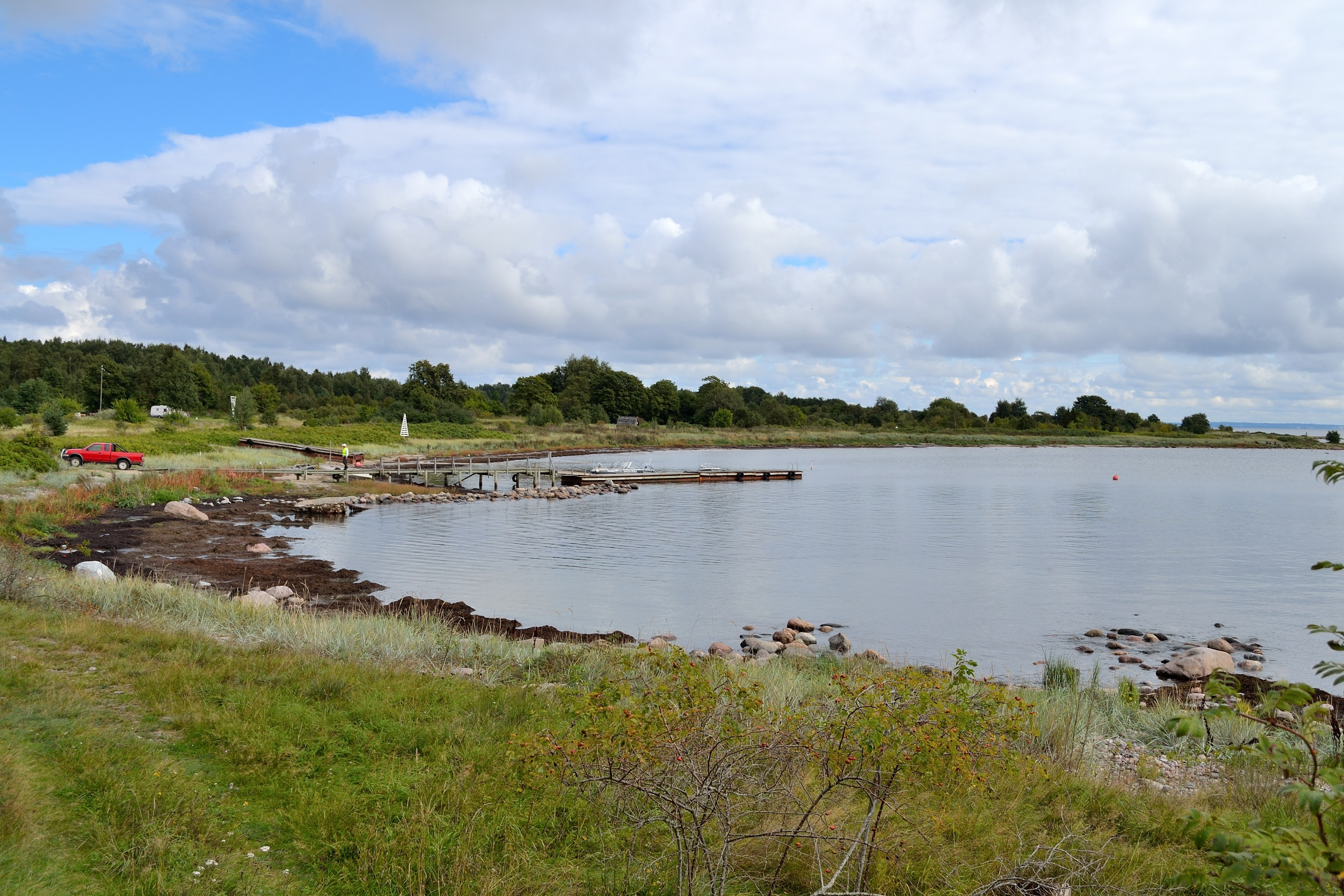
Boat harbour on the southern coast of Naissaar island.

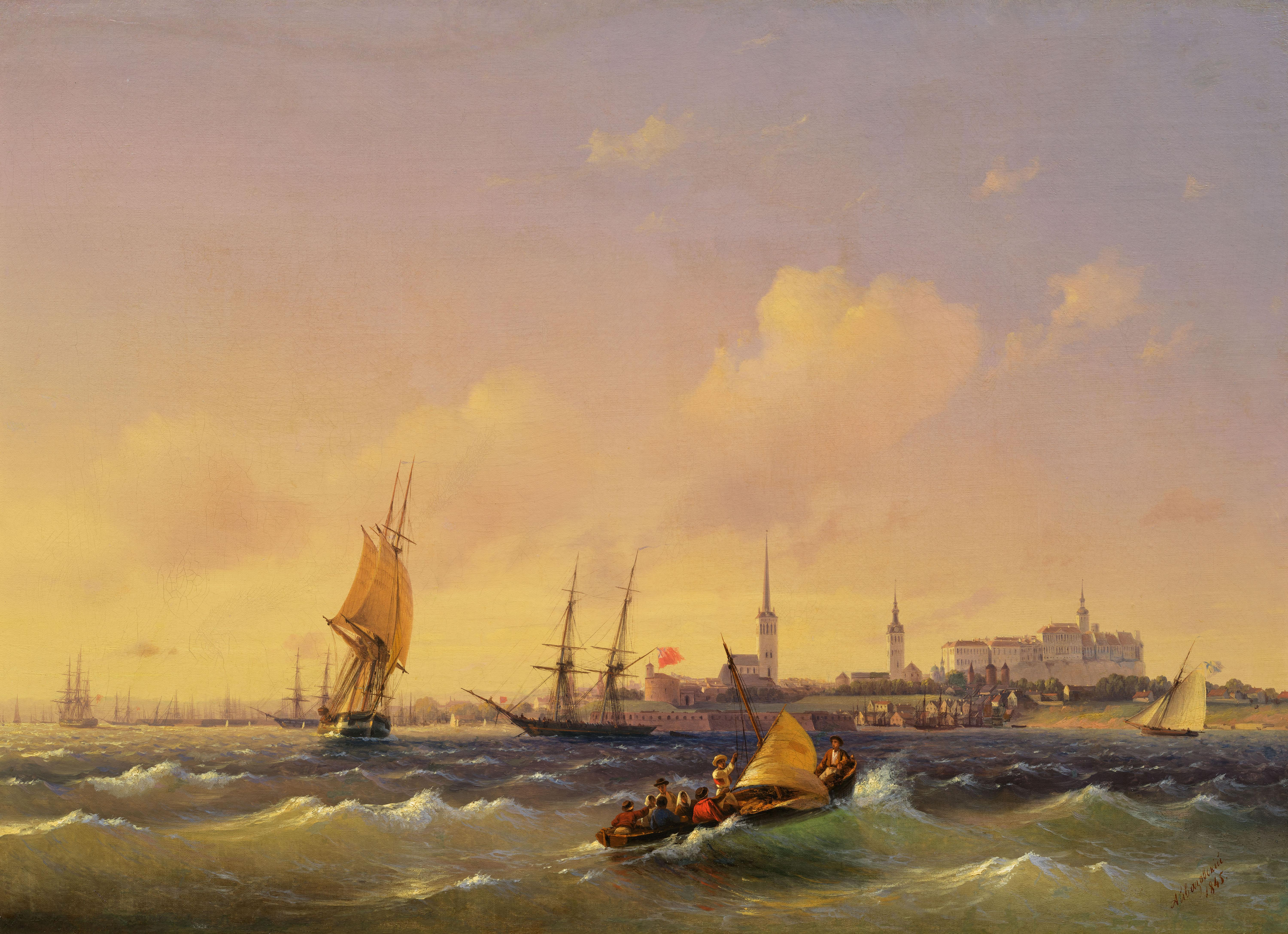
Tallinn Bay by Ivan Aivazovsky (1845).

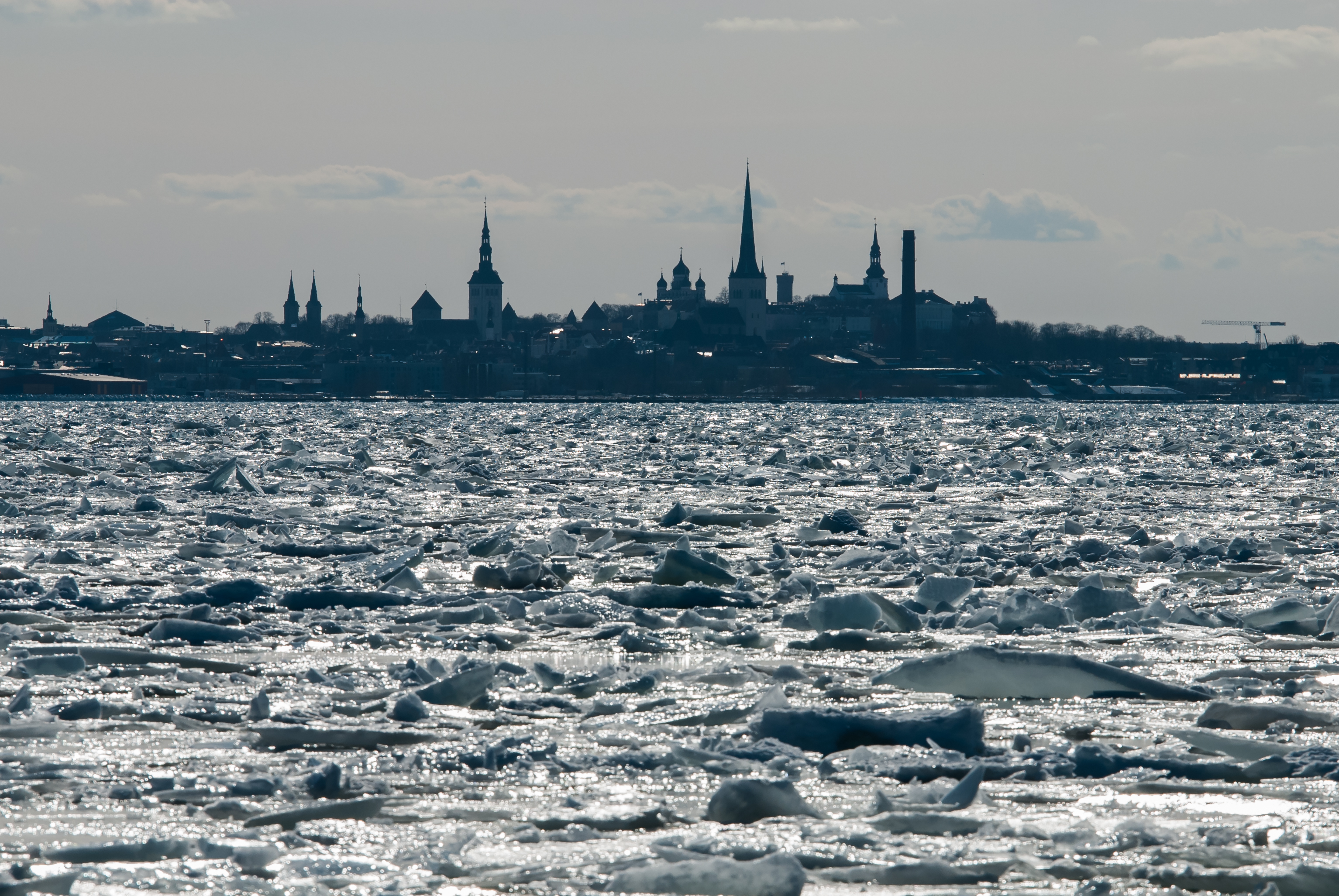
Tallinn Bay at winter

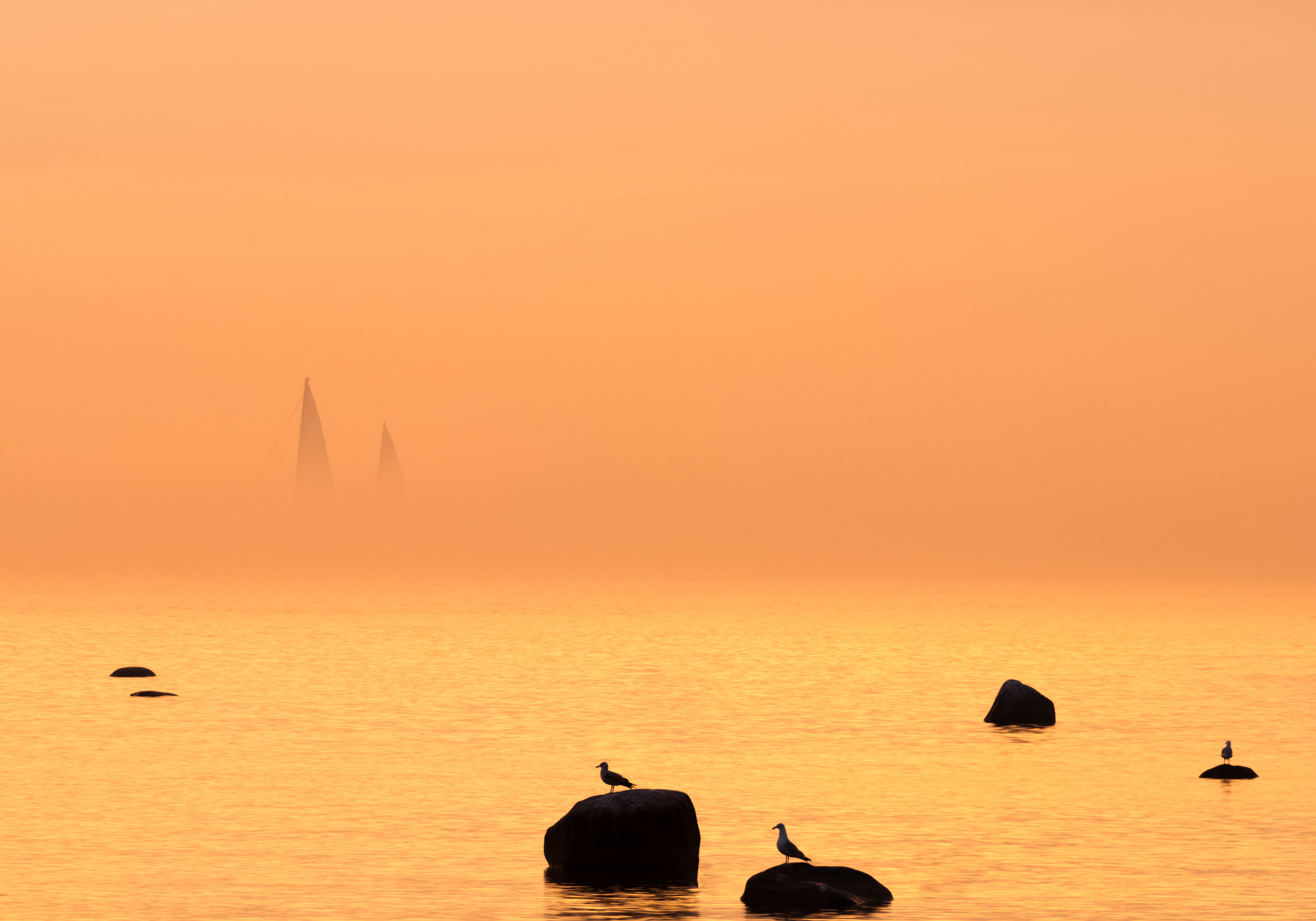
Tallinn Bay in fog at sunset

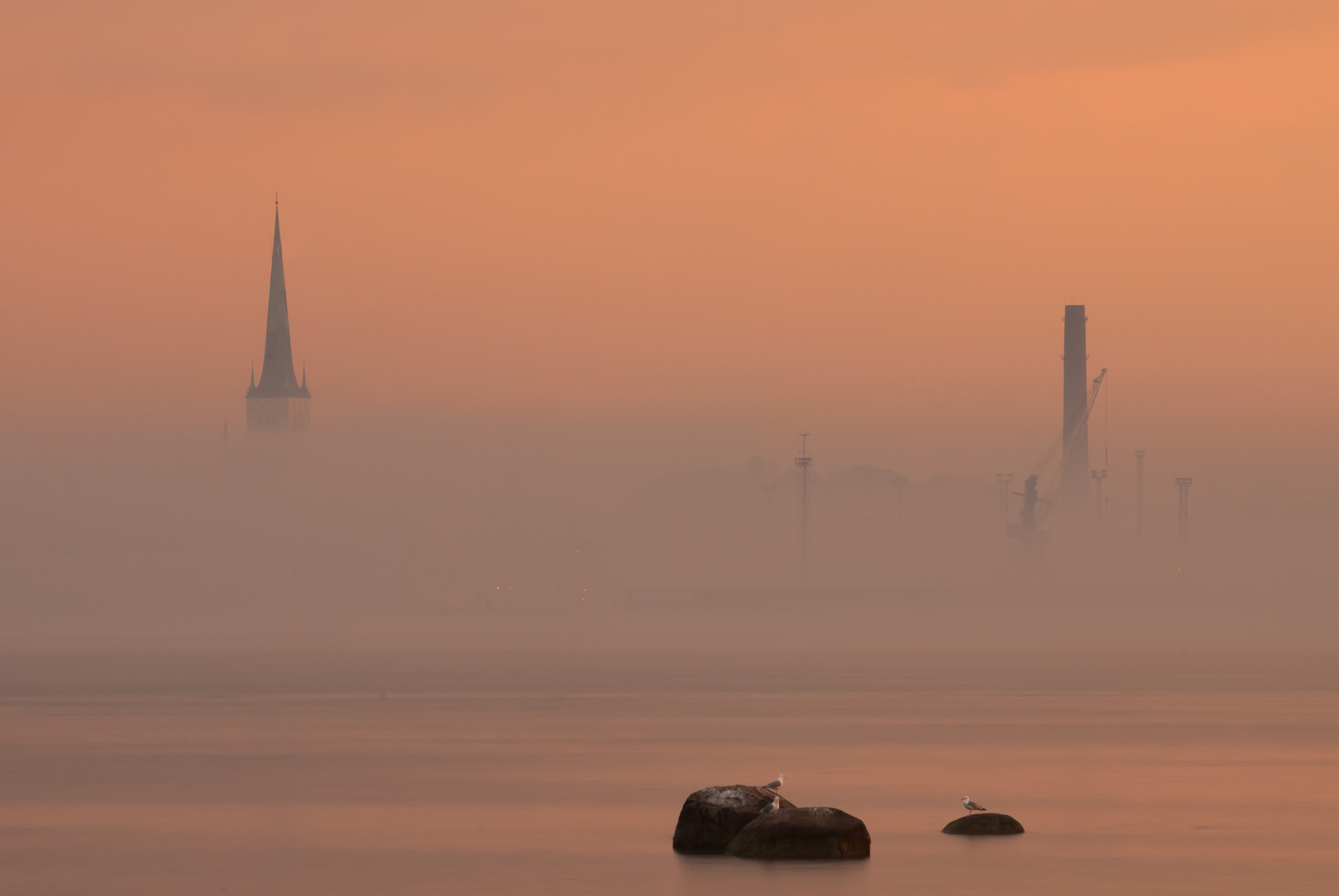
Foggy sunset at Tallinn Bay

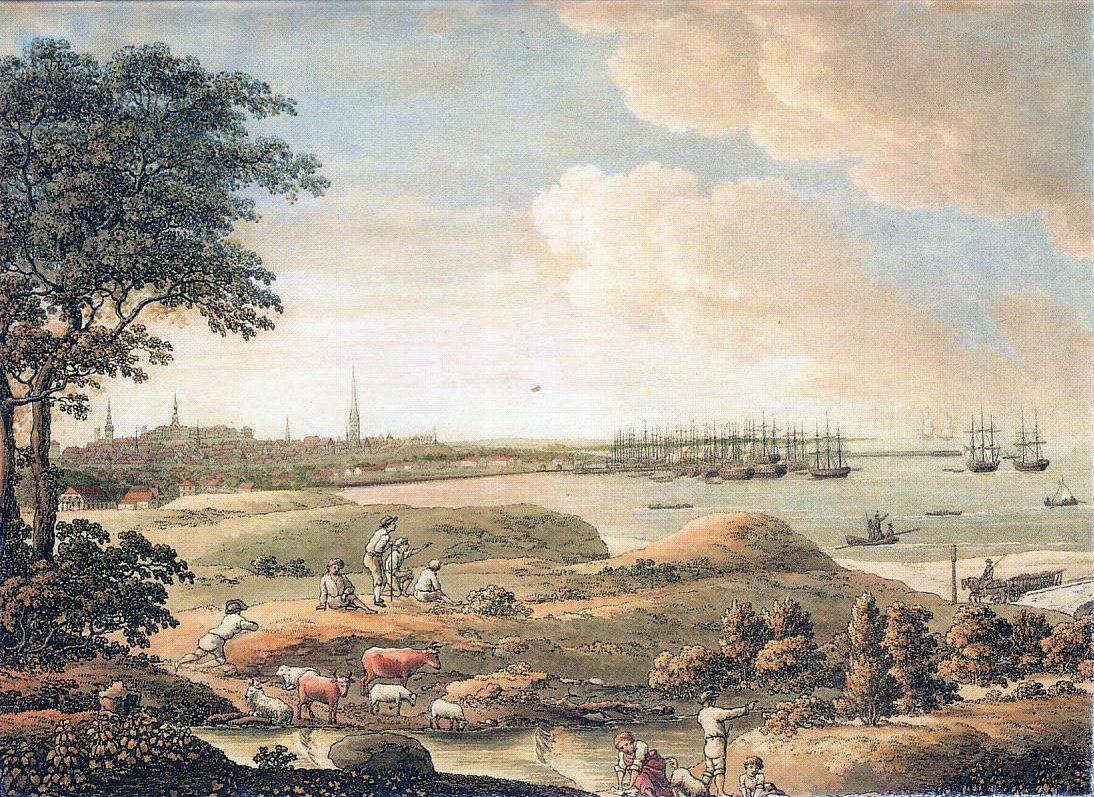
Tallinn Roadstead in 1816

== See also ==
- Bungsberg, ship
- Copterline Flight 103
- Estonian Maritime Museum
- Charles Leroux
- Tallinn Olympic Yachting Centre
