= Saaremaa Harbour =

Harbour in Estonia

Coordinates: 58°32′10″N 22°14′10″E

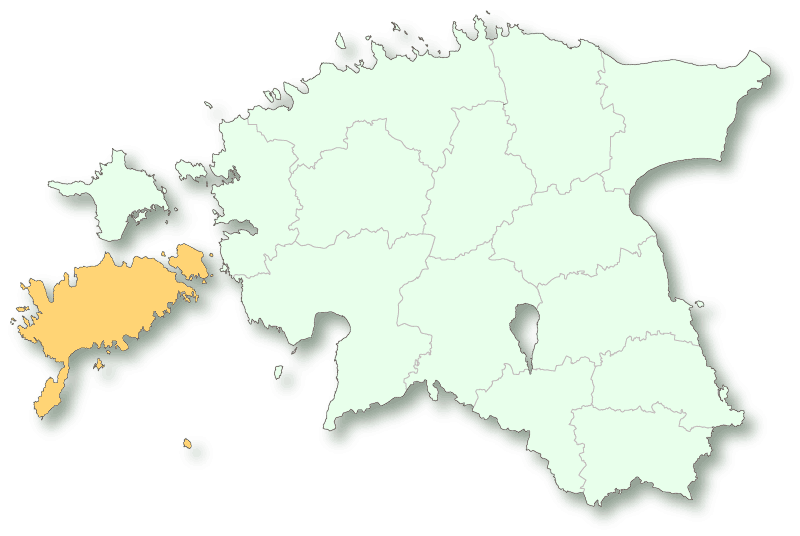
Map of Estonia with location of Saaremaa Harbour in Saare County

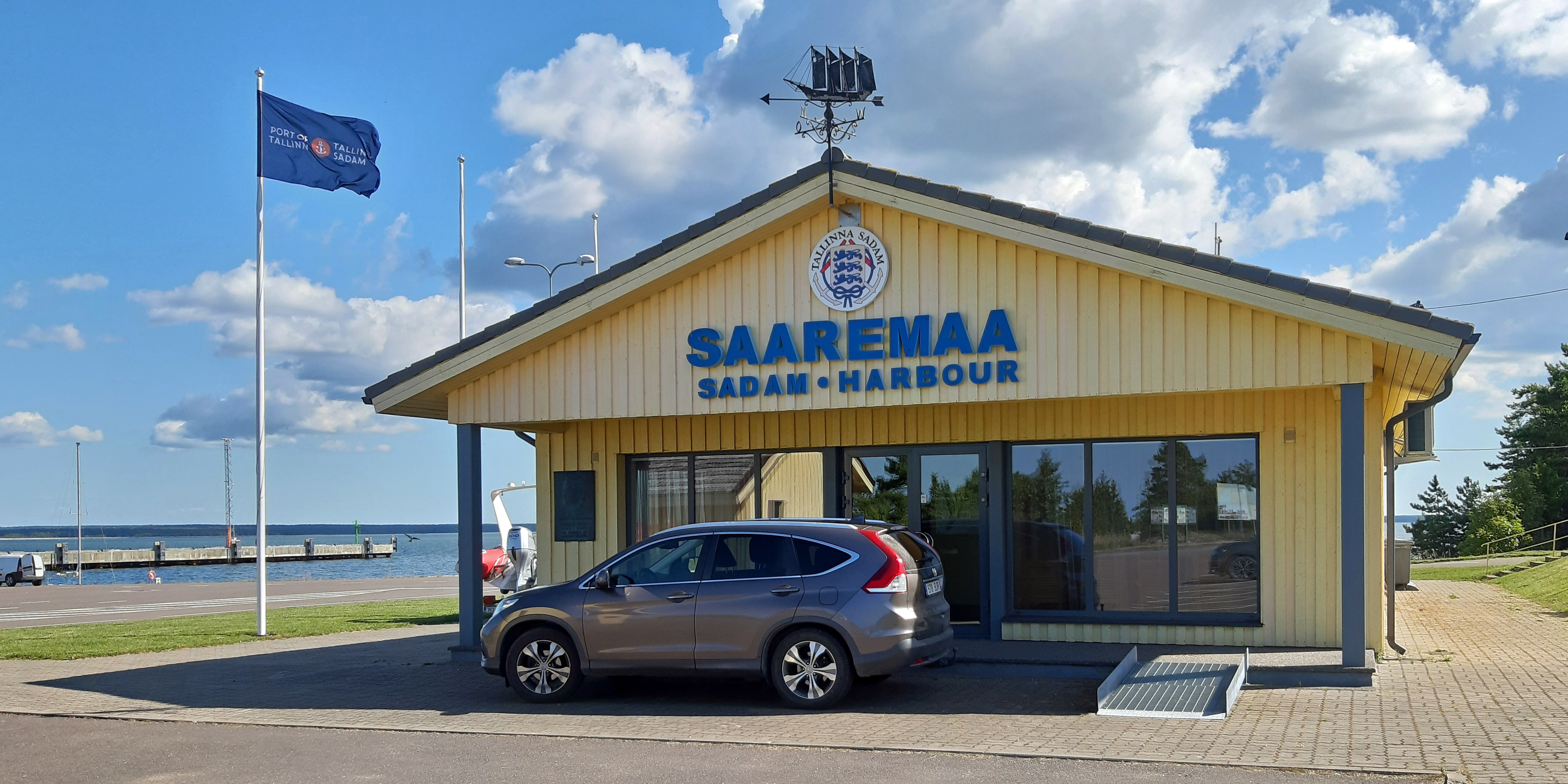
Saaremaa Harbour buildings, 2020

Saaremaa Harbour (Estonian: Saaremaa Sadam) is a deepwater harbour on the north coast of the Estonian island of Saaremaa. With a natural depth of 10 metres, the two quays are capable of serving the largest cruise ships sailing in the Baltic Sea. There is also a floating berth for small vessels.

The harbour is located in the village of Ninase near Küdema Bay. It was completed in 2006 and is owned by the Port of Tallinn.

In its first ten years of operation Saaremaa Harbour accommodated 30 different cruise ships, owned by 19 cruise companies. In 2016 only two cruise ships called at the harbour. It was reported that the Port of Tallinn wanted the harbour to develop into a multifunctional port and start servicing more cargo ships. In 2018 Saarte Hääl wrote of Saaremaa Harbour: "There is no longer any talk of profitability."

On 13 June 2023, Saaremaa Harbour simultaneously hosted two cruise ships for the first time in its history. Over 600 tourists from Germany and the United States disembarked from Amadea and Silver Wind, respectively.

In 2024, Saaremaa Harbour was the Saare County's biggest fishing port. 4,002 tonnes of herring and sprat were landed by trawlers at the harbour.
