= Paljassaare =

Subdistrict of Tallinn, Estonia

Coordinates: 59.463571°N 24.702587°E

- Subdistrict of Tallinn
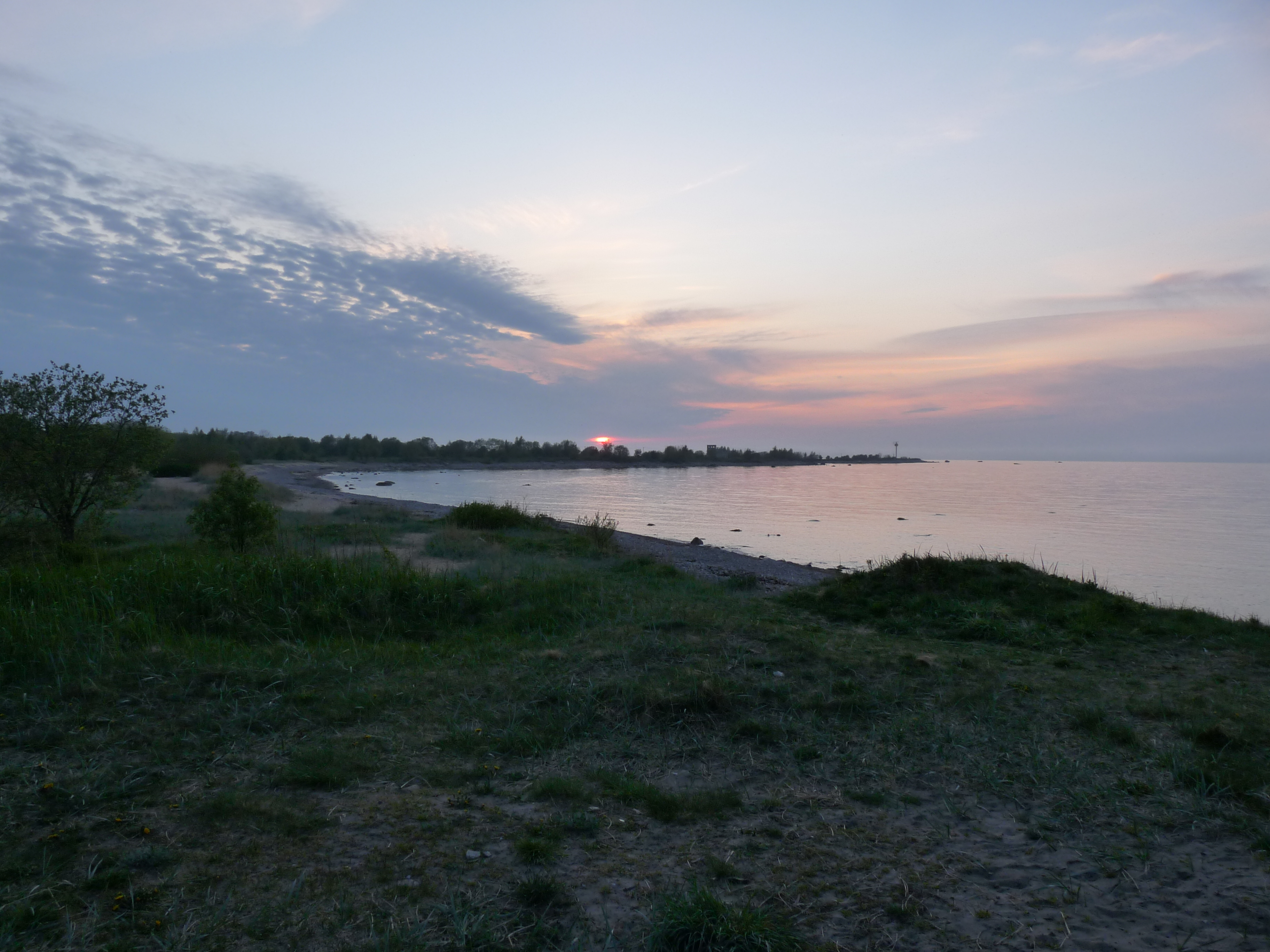
- The shoreline on the northeastern side of Paljassaare

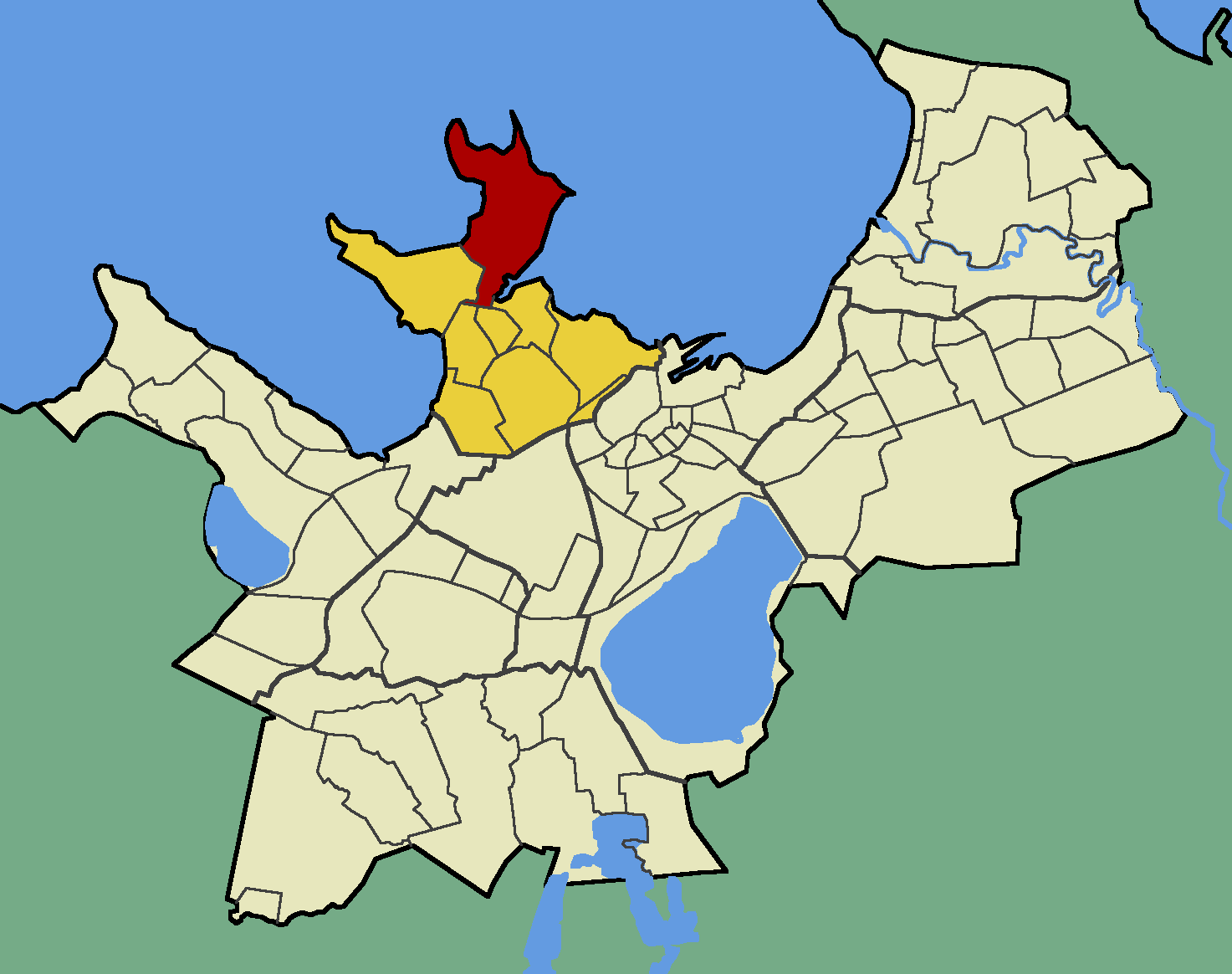
- Paljassaare within Põhja-Tallinn.
- Country: Estonia
- County: Harju County
- City: Tallinn
- District: Põhja-Tallinn

Population (01.01.2014)
  - Total: 583

Paljassaare (Estonian for 'bare island') is the name for both the Paljassaare Peninsula in Tallinn Bay and a subdistrict (Estonian: asum) in the district of Põhja-Tallinn (lit. 'northern Tallinn') in the city of Tallinn, the capital of Estonia. The subdistrict is located on the peninsula.

Paljassaare has a population of 583 (as of 1 January 2014).

== Paljassaare Harbour ==
Paljassaare Harbour is a cargo port that primarily specialises in handling mixed cargo, coal, and oil products, as well as timber and perishables. The harbour is also used by the neighbouring refinery for cooking oil shipments.

The harbour has an area of 43.6 ha and has 11 berths.

Vessels enter and leave the harbour through a canal, which is 800 metres long, 90 to 150 metres wide, and 9.0 metres deep.

Terminals of Paljassaare Harbour

- Oil terminal
- Cooking oil terminal
- Timber terminal
- Coal terminal
- General cargo terminals (including a reefer terminal)
- Dry bulk terminal

== Gallery ==
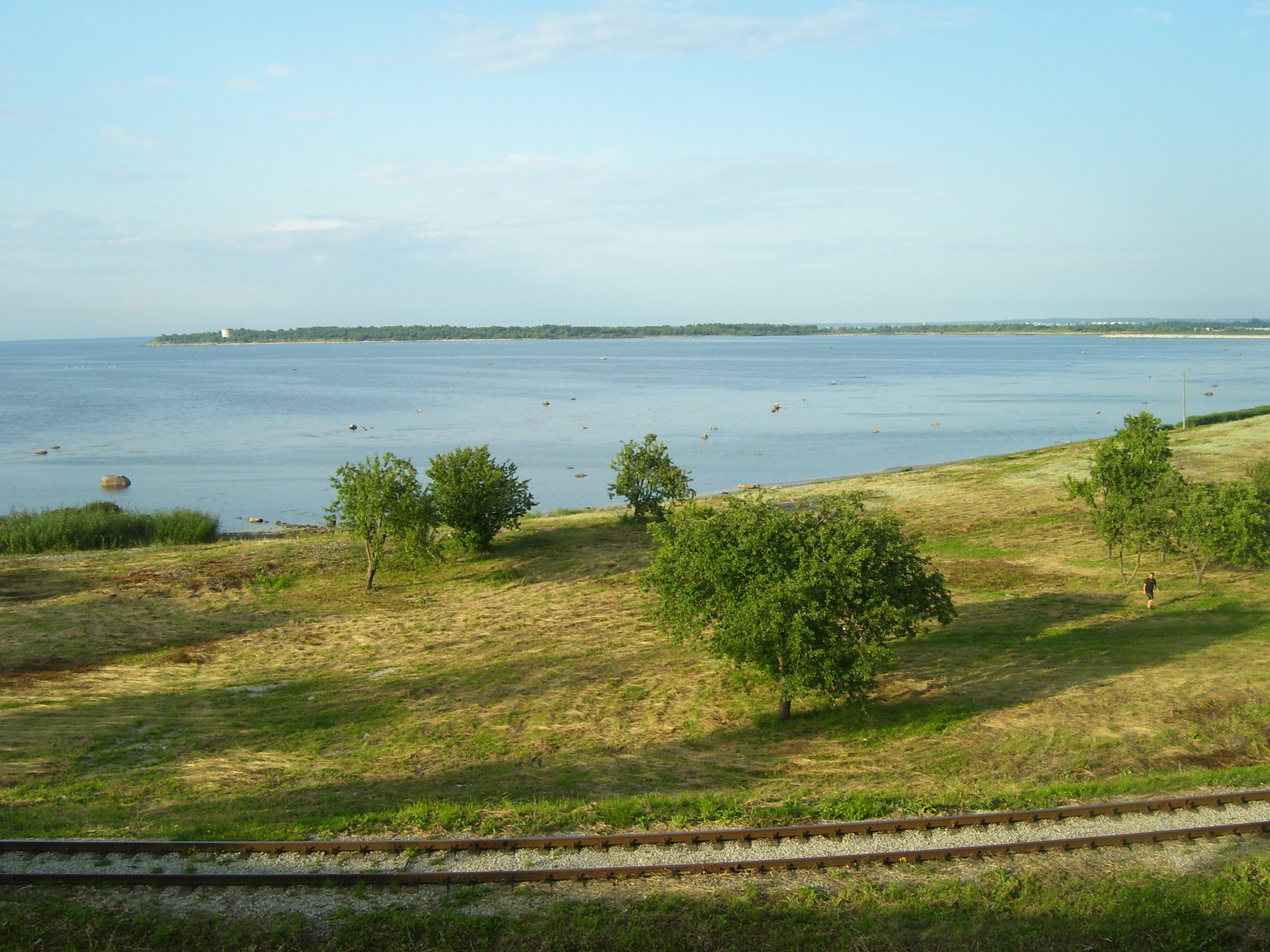
View of the Paljassaare Peninsula from the Kopli Peninsula

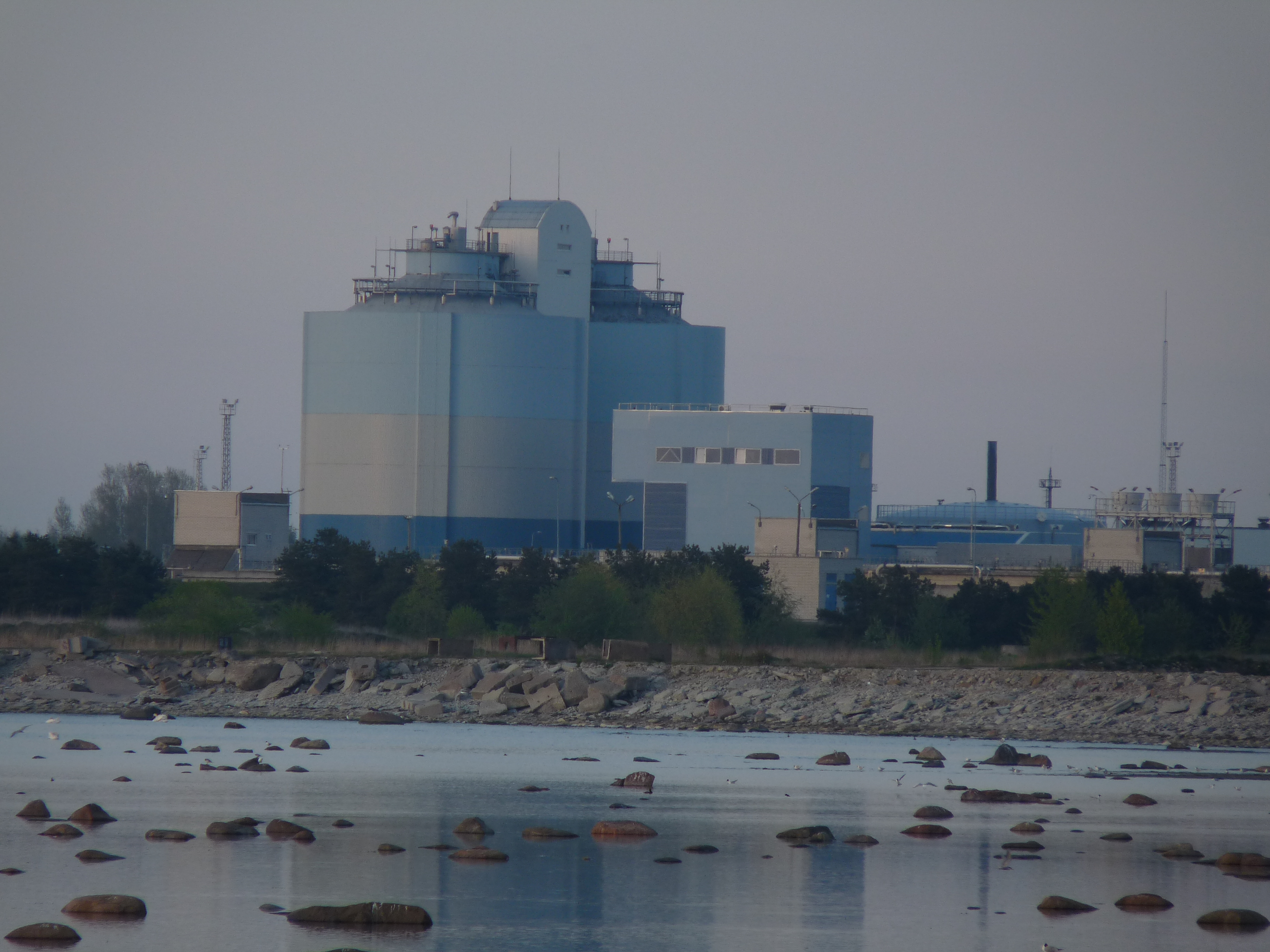
Tallinn sewage treatment plant in the middle of Paljassaare

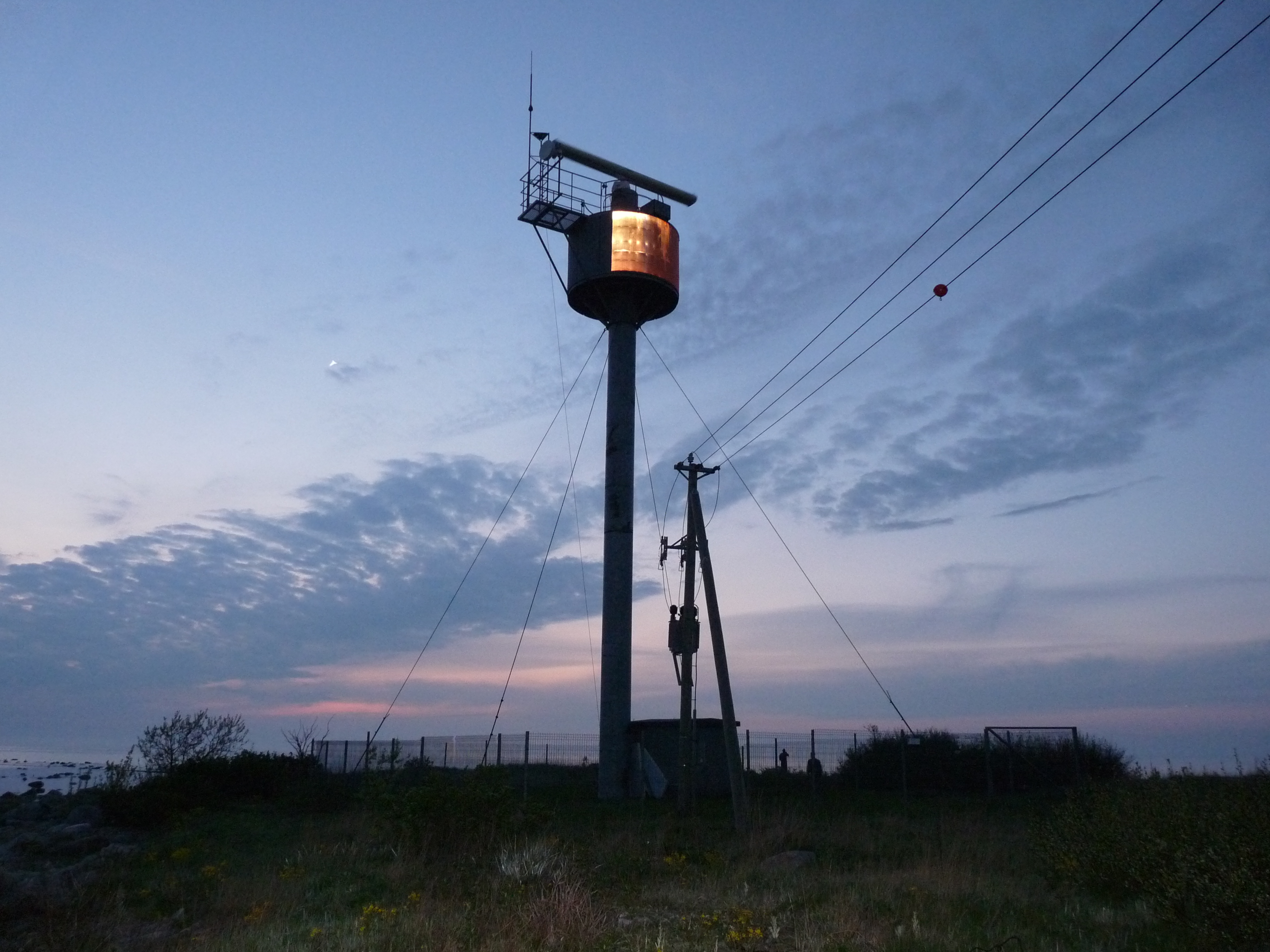
A marine radar tower on Little Cape Paljassaar (Väike-Paljassaar)

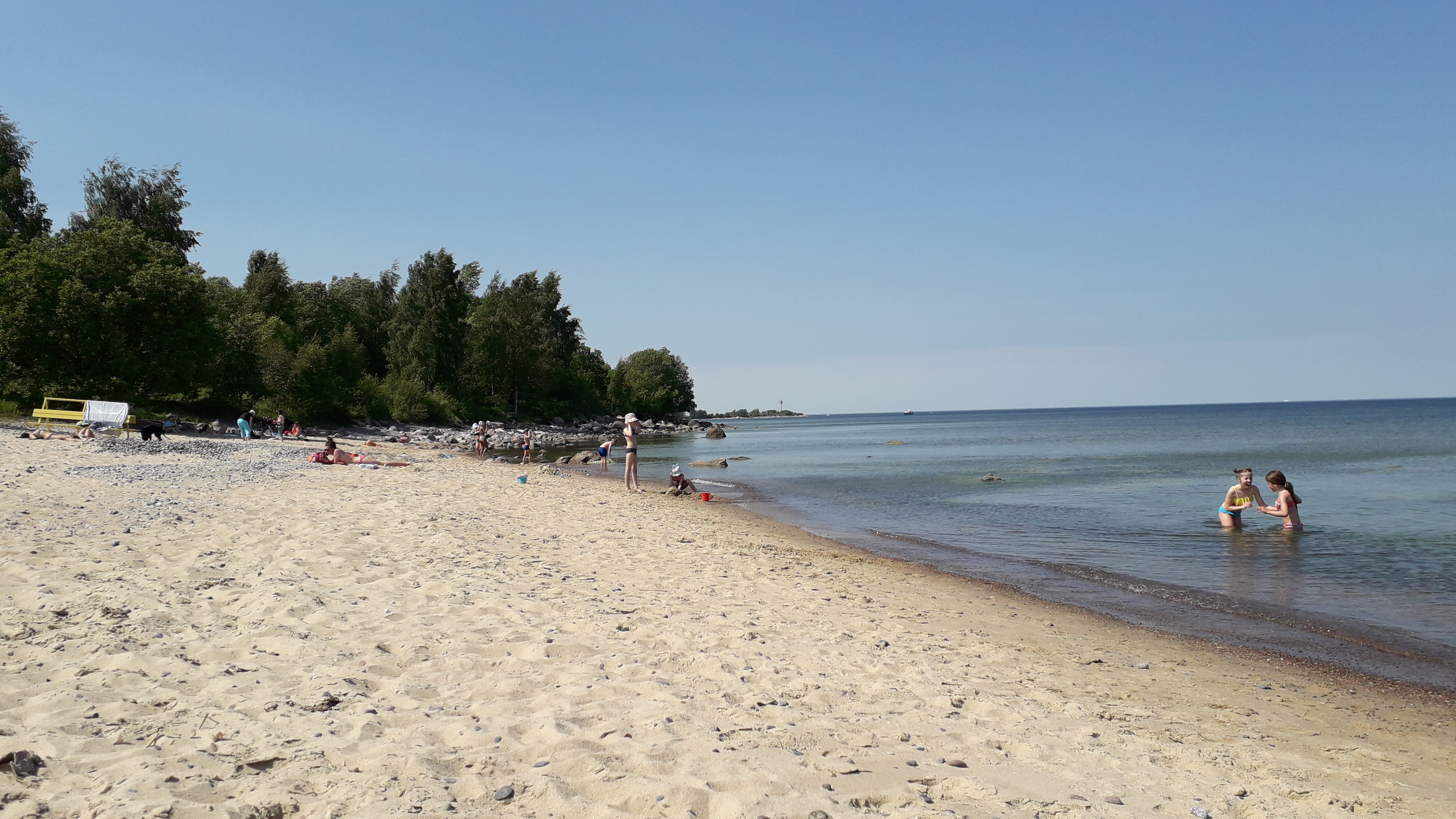
Pikakari beach in Tallinn
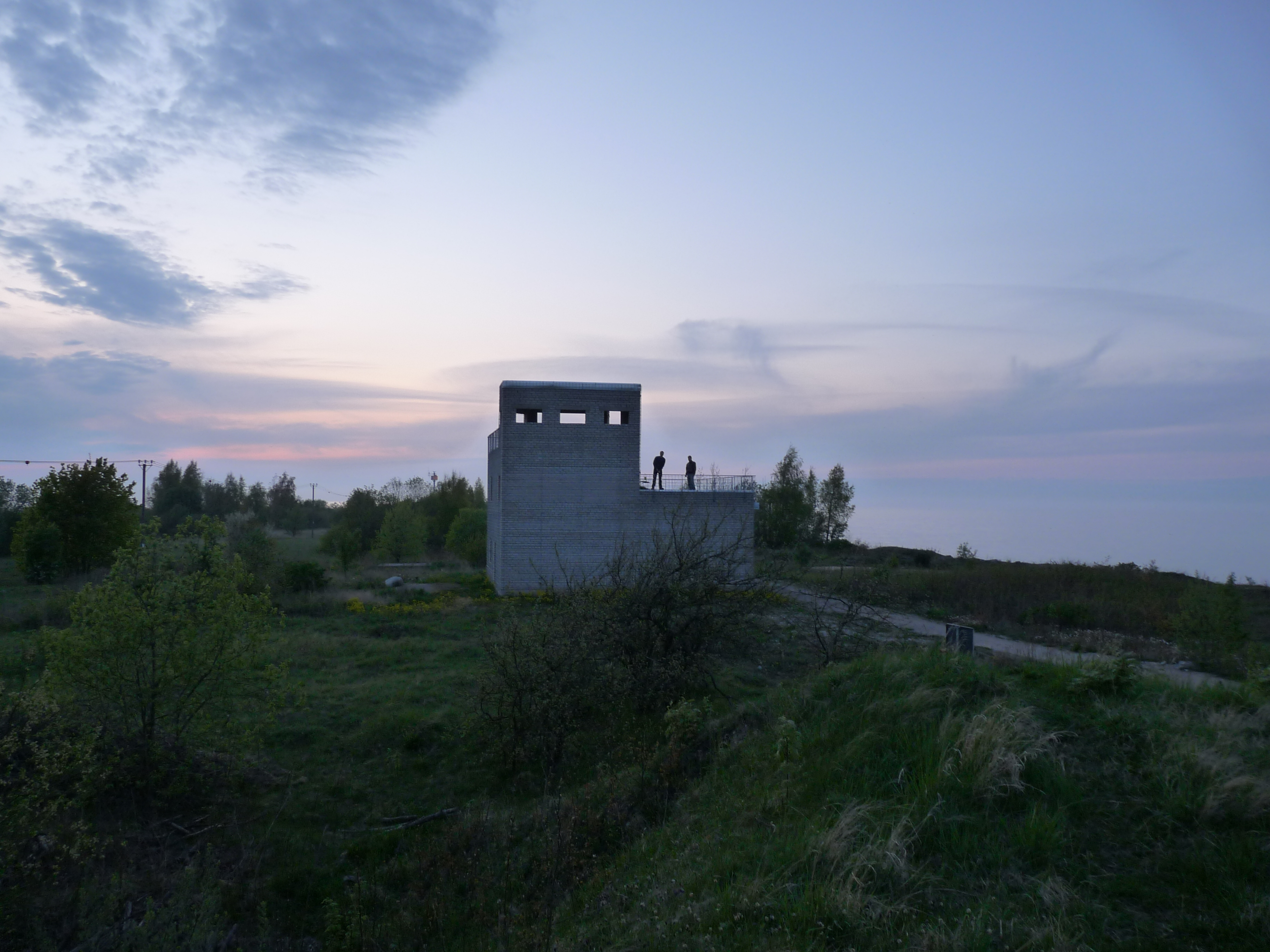
Former military structure now used as an observation platform

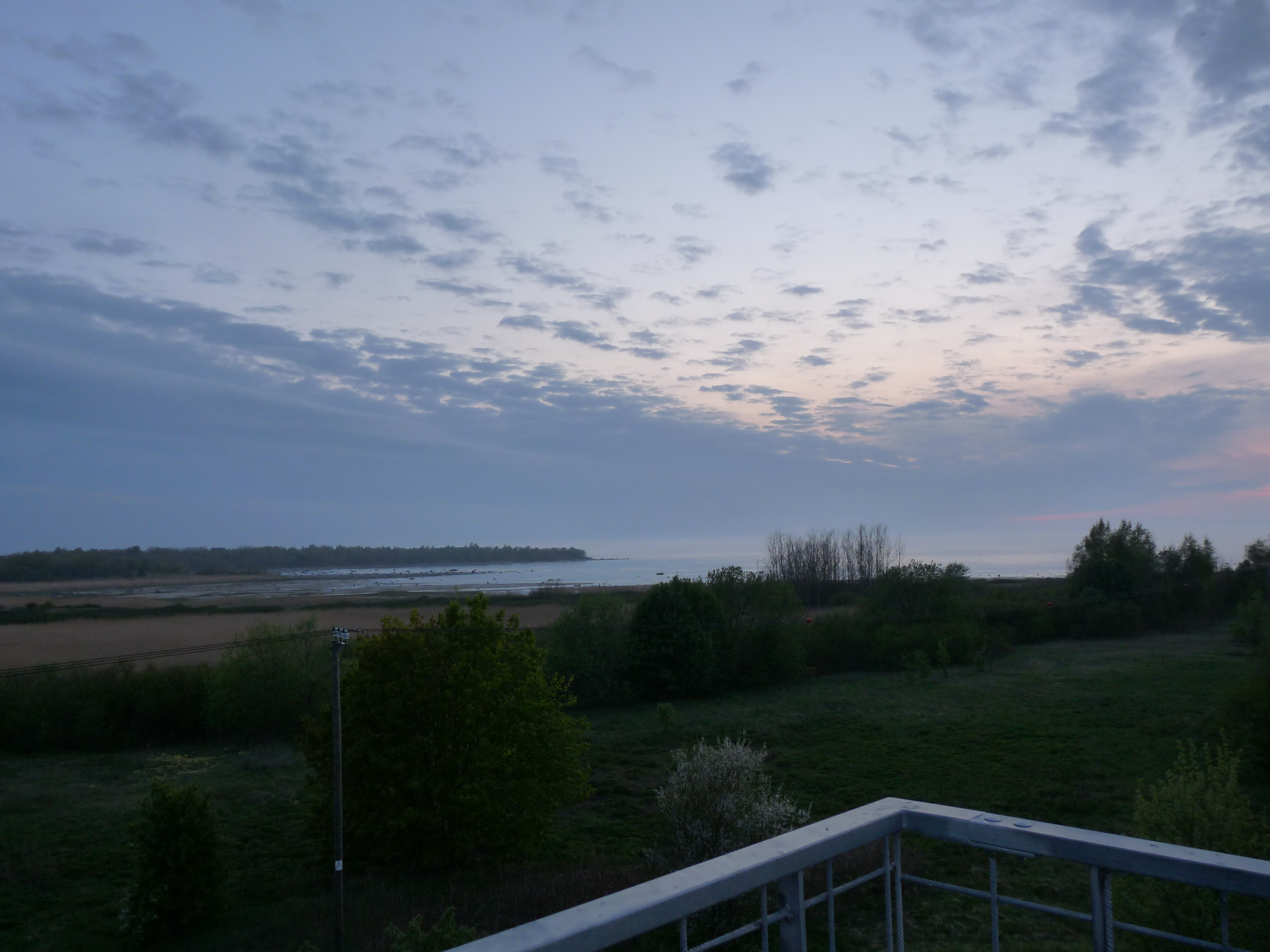
View toward Big Cape Paljassaar (Suur-Paljassaar)

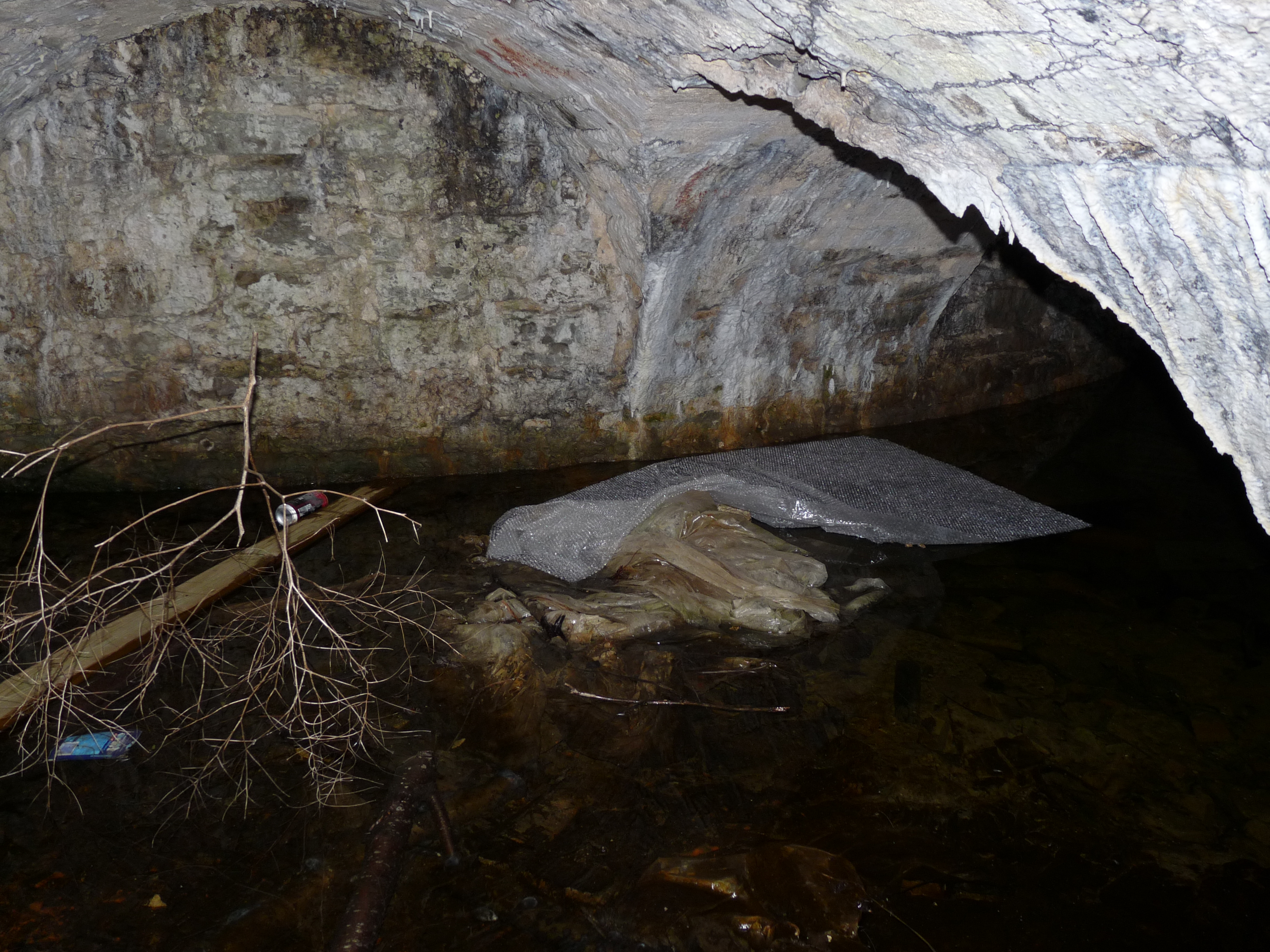
Caves full of water
