= Paljassaare Harbour =

Harbour in Estonia

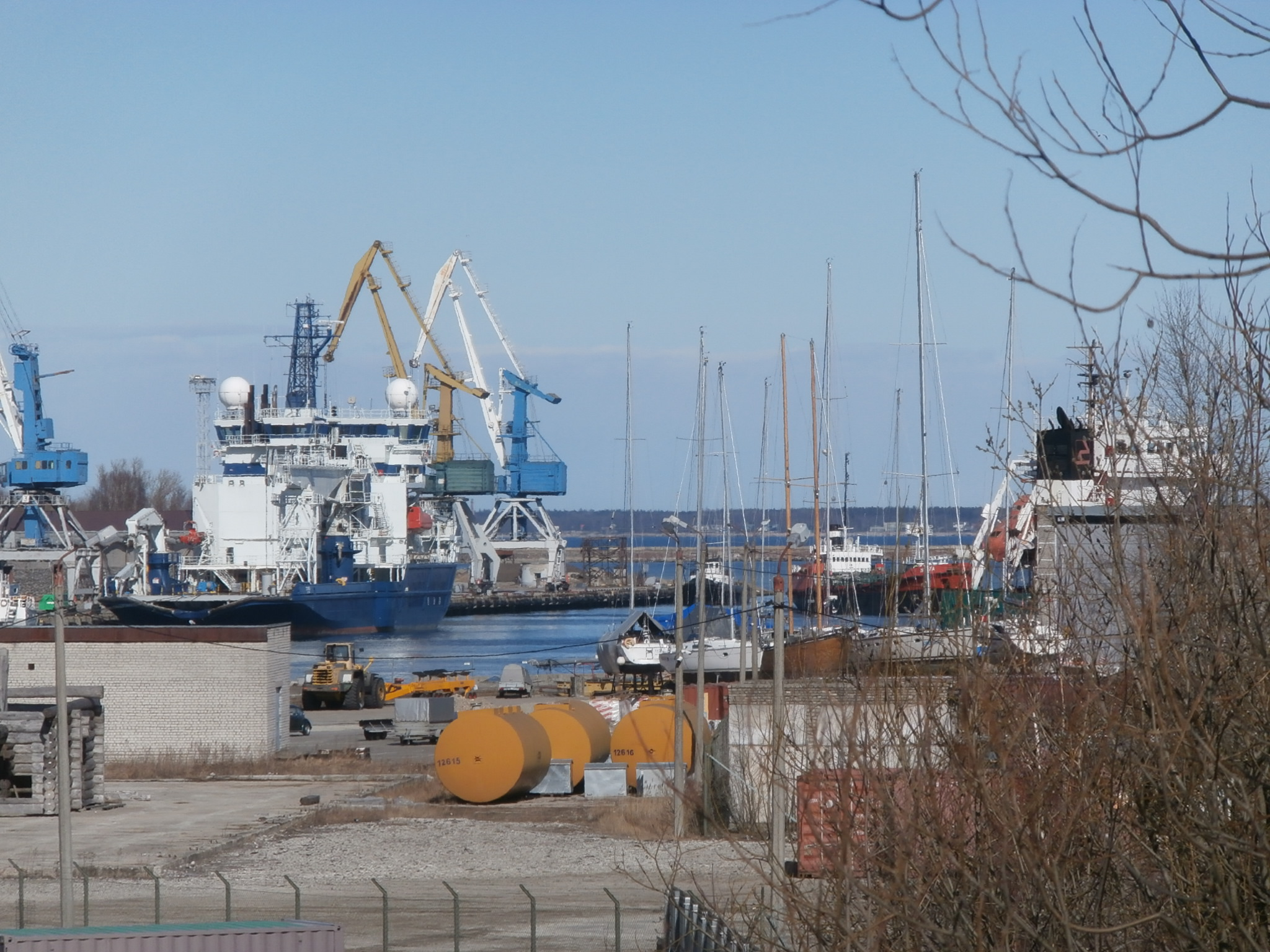

Location
- Country: Estonia
- Location: Paljassaare and Karjamaa, Tallinn
- Coordinates: 59°27′30″N 24°42′24″E

Details
- Operated by: Port of Tallinn
- Type of harbour: cargo port
- Size of harbour: 43.6 ha
- Land area: 33.5 ha
- No. of berths: 11

Statistics
- Website http://www.portoftallinn.com/paljassaare-harbour

Paljassaare Harbour (Estonian: Paljassaare sadam) is a seaport situated in Paljassaare, Tallinn, Estonia. Vessels enter and exit the harbour through a canal that is 800m long, 90-150m wide, and 9.0m deep.

== Overview ==
It is a cargo port, which primarily specialises in handling mixed cargo, coal and oil products, as well as timber and perishables. The harbour is also used for cooking oil shipments by the neighbouring refinery.

Terminals of Paljassaare Harbour:

- oil terminal
- cooking oil terminal
- timber terminal
- coal terminal
- general cargo terminals (incl. reefer terminal)
- dry bulk terminal
