= Ninase =

Village in Estonia

Coordinates: 58°32′N 22°15′E

- Village
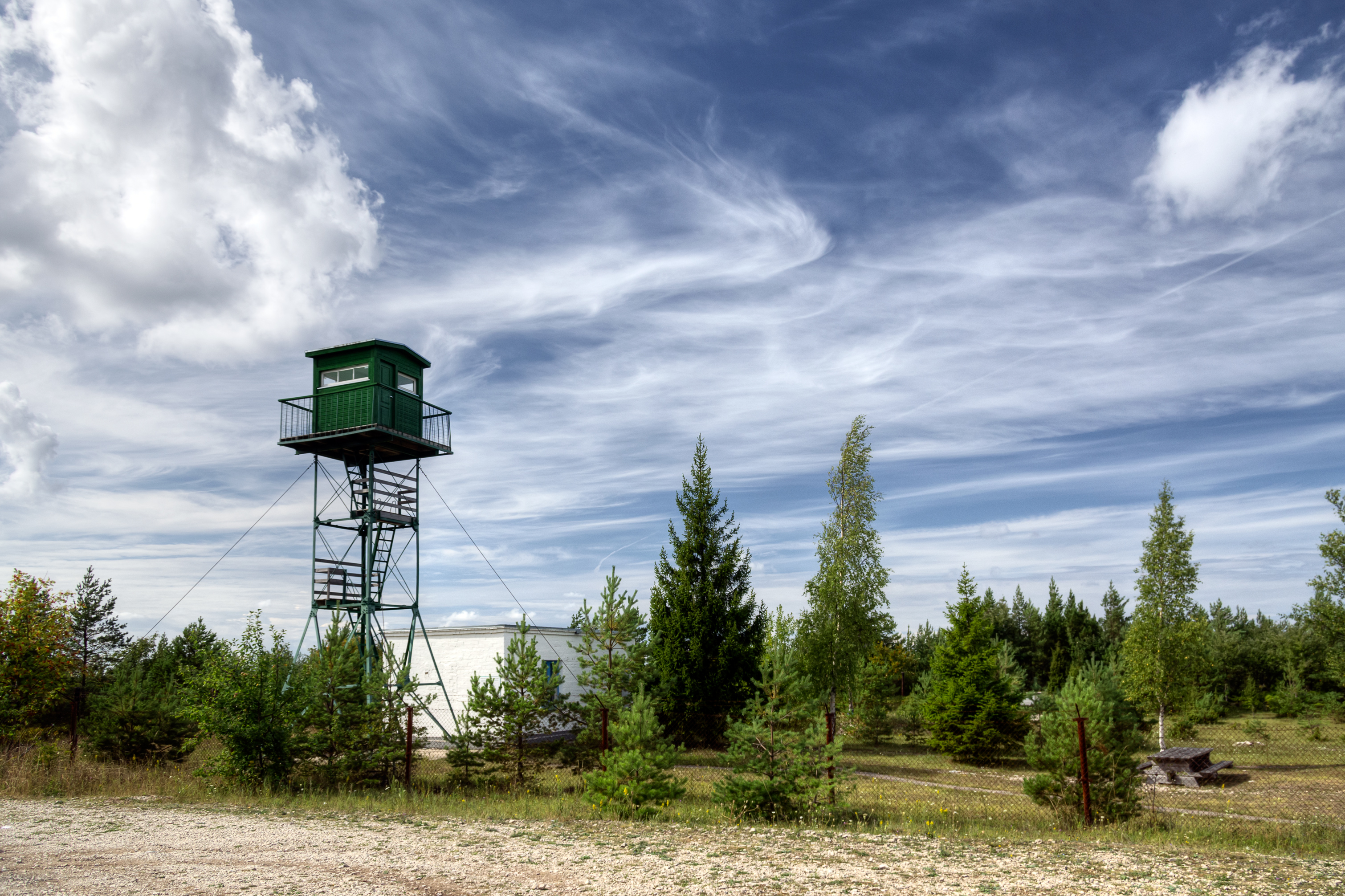
- Viewing tower in Ninase
- Interactive map of Ninase
- Country: Estonia
- County: Saare County
- Parish: Saaremaa Parish
- Time zone: UTC+2 (EET)
  - Summer (DST): UTC+3 (EEST)

Ninase is a village in Saaremaa Parish, Saare County in western Estonia.

Before the administrative reform in 2017, the village was in Mustjala Parish.

The Saaremaa Harbour is located in Ninase.

The village is located on Ninase peninsula where the highest cliff on the 1 km shoreline is 5 meters high. The surrounding nature and birds can be observed from the 12 m high tower next to the village.
