= List of cemeteries in Estonia =

This is a list of cemeteries in Estonia.

== Harju County ==
=== Tallinn ===
- St. Barbara's Cemetery (14th century – 1710)
- Hiiu-Rahu Cemetery (est. 1919)
- St John's Almshouse Cemetery
- Kalamaja Cemetery
- Kopli Cemetery
- Liiva Cemetery
- Maarjamäe German military Cemetery
- Metsakalmistu
- Mõigu Cemetery
- Pärnamäe Cemetery (est. 1963)
- Pirita new Cemetery (est. 1898)
- Pirita old Cemetery (est. 1436)
- Pirita German war prisoners' Cemetery (1944–1950)
- Rahumäe Cemetery (est. 1903)
  - Jewish Cemetery (est. 1911)
  - Firemen's Cemetery (est. 1927)
- Siselinna Cemetery
  - Alexander Nevsky Cemetery (est. 1775)
  - Old Charles' Cemetery (est. 1864)
  - Military Cemetery (est. 1887)
  - Polish Catholic Cemetery (1844 – demolished 1950s)
  - Old Jewish Cemetery (18th century – demolished 1963)
  - Muslim Cemetery (18th century – demolished 1950s?)
  - Cholera Cemetery (18th century)

== Ida-Viru County ==
- Siivertsi Cemetery

== Järva County ==
=== Paide ===
- Reopalu Cemetery
- Sillaotsa Cemetery

== Lääne County ==
=== Haapsalu ===
- Metsakalmistu
- Old Cemetery

=== Lihula ===
- Lihula New Cemetery
- Lihula-Chapel Cemetery
- Lihula-Russian Cemetery
- Tuudi-Sause Cemetery
- Kirbla Cemetery

=== Nõva ===
- Nõva Cemetery

=== Vormsi ===
- Vormsi Cemetery

== Pärnu County ==
=== Pärnu ===
- Pärnu Alevi Cemetery
- Metsakalmistu
- Vana-Pärnu Cemetery

== Saare County ==
=== Kuressaare ===
- Kudjape Cemetery

== Tartu County ==
=== Tartu ===
- Lohkva Jewish Cemetery (est. 1935)
- Tartu Old Jewish Cemetery (est. 1859)
- Old Believers Cemetery
- St. Paul's Cemetery
  - Alexander Nevsky Cemetery
- Puiestee cemetery
  - New St. John's Cemetery
  - Old St. Peter's Cemetery
- Raadi cemetery
  - Old St. John's cemetery
  - St. Peter's cemetery
  - St. Mary's cemetery
  - Uspensky cemetery
  - Military cemetery
  - University cemetery
- Rahumäe cemetery
