= Peetri, Harju County =

Borough in Estonia

Peetri
- Small borough
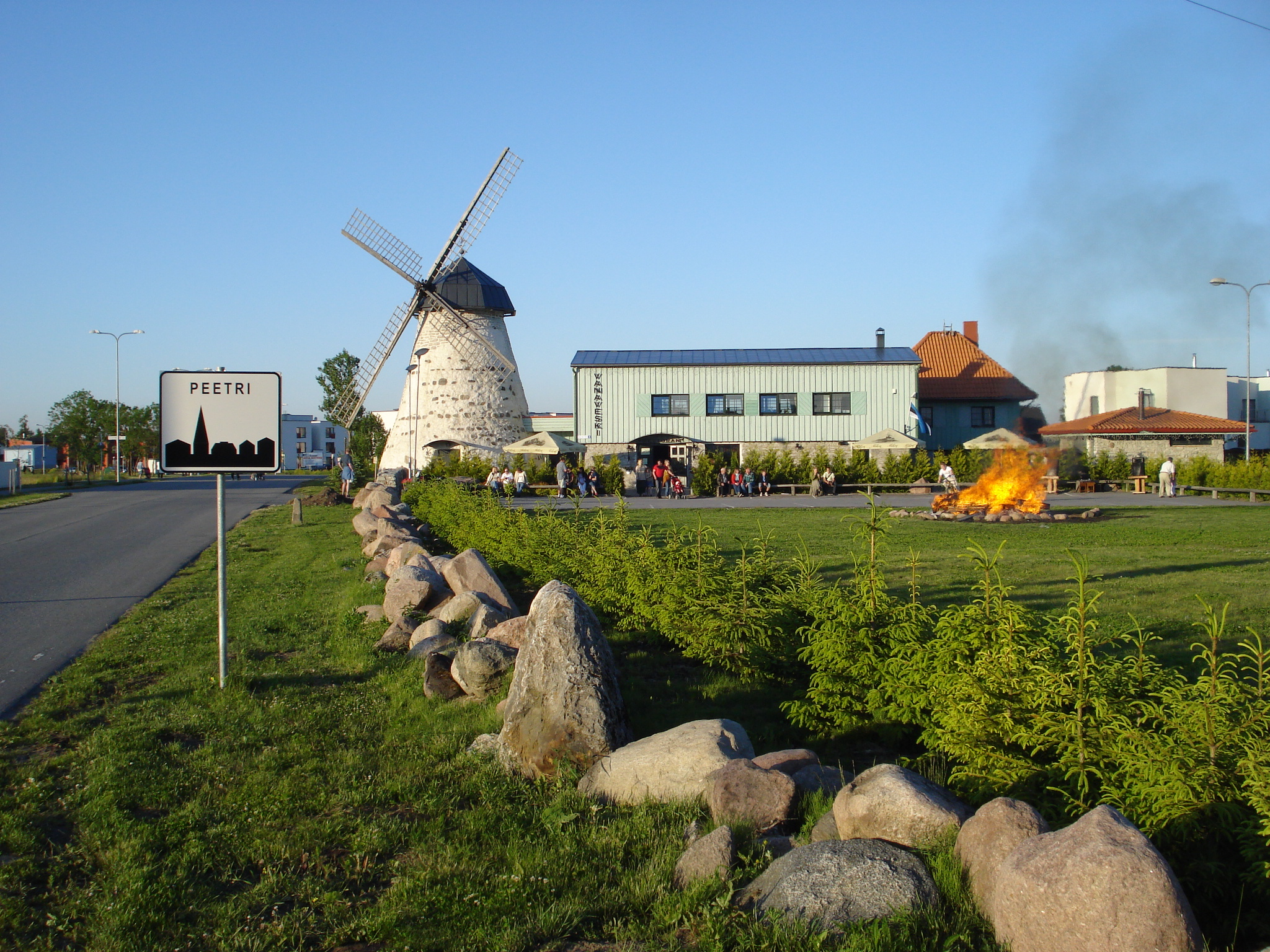

- Location in Estonia
- Coordinates: 59°23′41″N 24°48′49″E
- Country: Estonia
- County: Harju County
- Municipality: Rae Parish
- First mentioned: 1631

Government
  - Borough elder: Margus Laula

Area
  - Total: 4.6 km^{2} (1.8 sq mi)

Population (01.01.2025)
  - Total: 6,502
  - Density: 1,400/km^{2} (3,700/sq mi)

Peetri (also Peetriküla in spoken language) is a small borough (Estonian: alevik) in Rae Parish, Harju County, in northern Estonia. It is bordered by the city of Tallinn.

According to official population registration Peetri had 6,502 inhabitants on 1 January 2025. According to last public census, population of Peetri was 4.435 inhabitants on December 31, 2011. According to the census data, share of ethnic Estonians was 82.8%; 17.2% were non-Estonians.

There are more than 500 dwelling buildings in Peetri, which includes several tens of apartment blocks. A kindergarten - primary school with sports hall, stadium and public library was completed in autumn 2009.

Most of the small borough is west of the E263 Tallinn–Tartu–Võru–Luhamaa highway, but the settlement includes also a part east of the highway named Mõigu. The total territory of the borough is 4.60 km^{2}, and the population density exceeds 1115/km^{2}.

The earliest documents mentioning Peetri date to 1631 (under name of Petriküll), in connection with a real estate transaction of Mõigu manor. The oldest preserved building in Peetri is a former windmill (1868), which now operates as Peetri Windmill Restaurant.

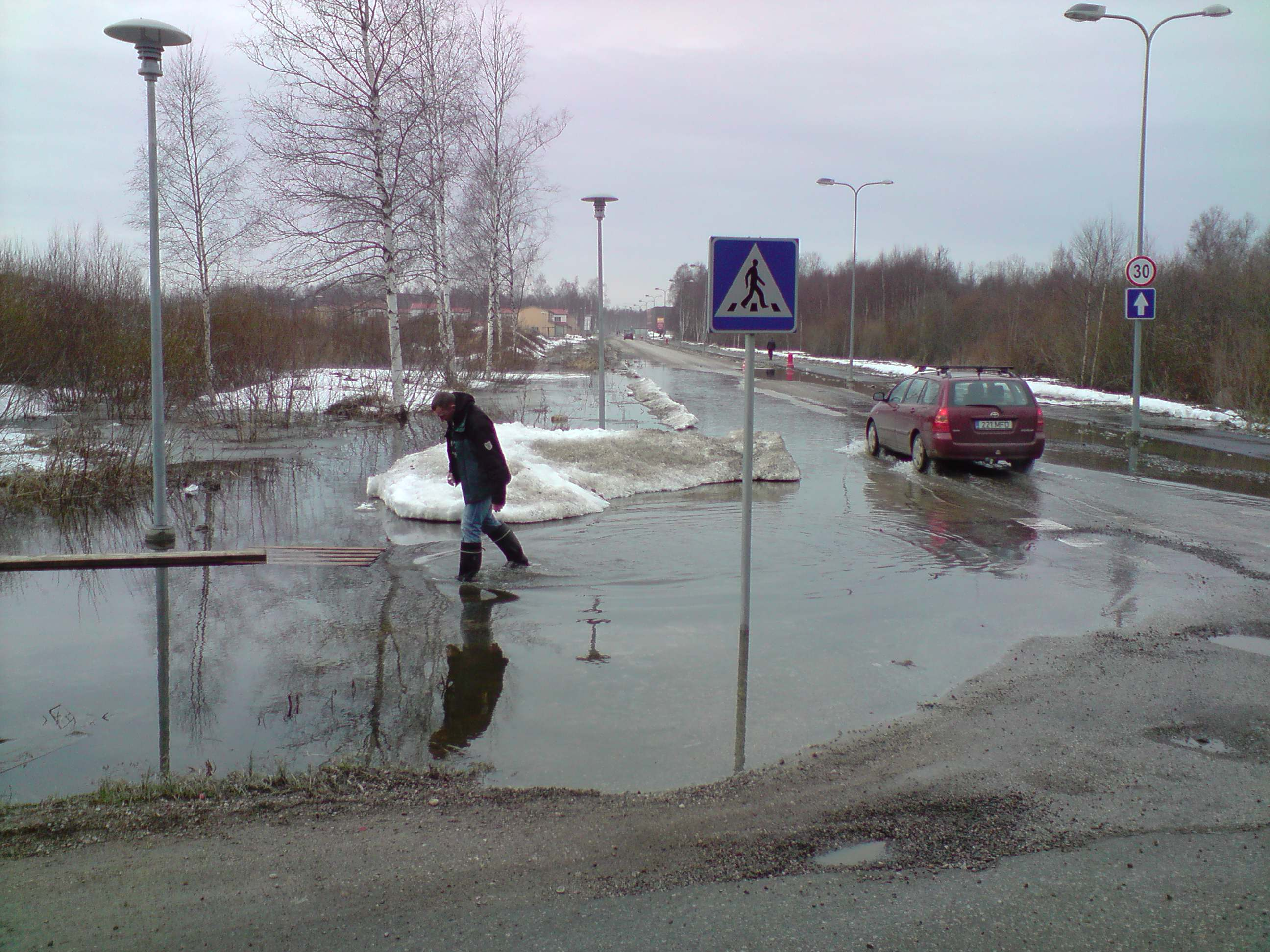
Streets in Peetri under a flood in 2010.

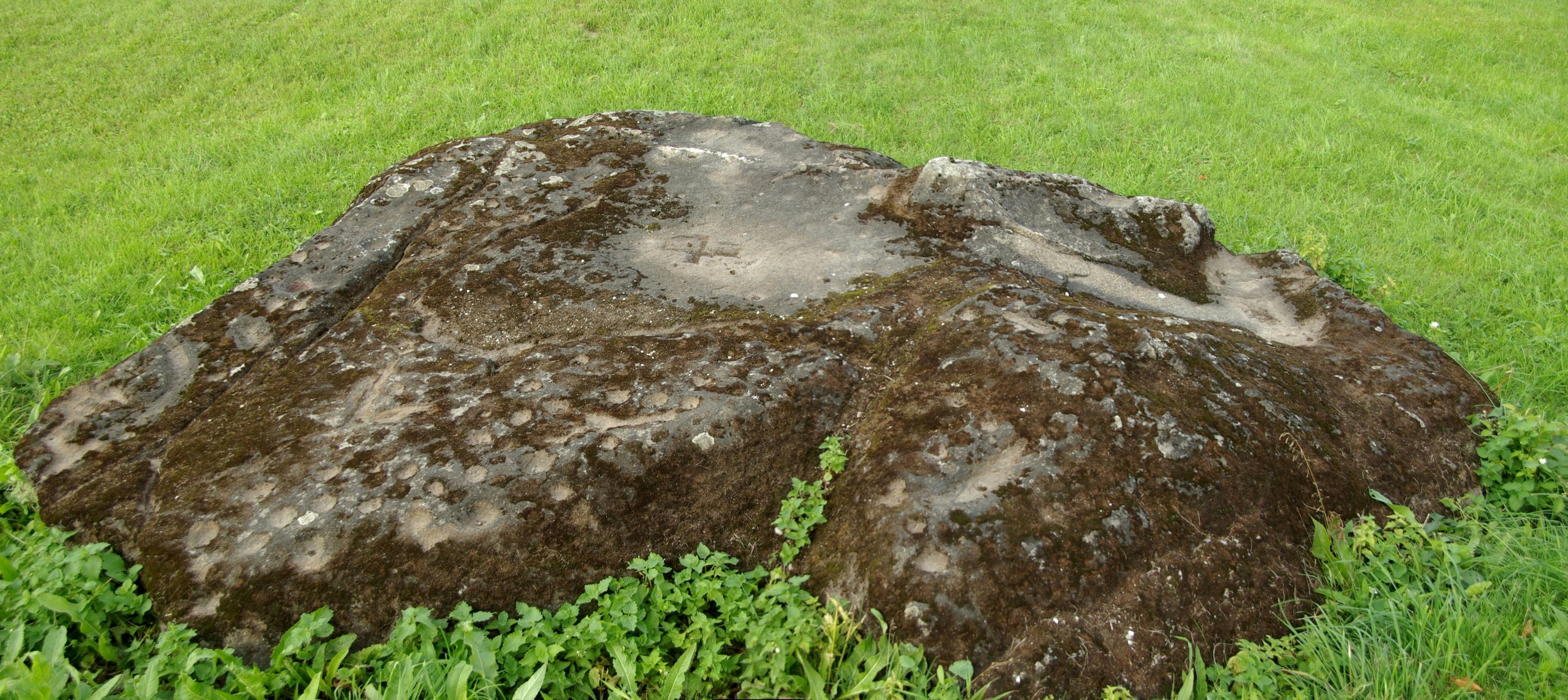
Assaku Witch Stone on the territory of Peetri
