= Mõigu Cemetery =

Defunct cemetery in Tallinn, Estonia

Coordinates: 59.4087309°N 24.8001337°E

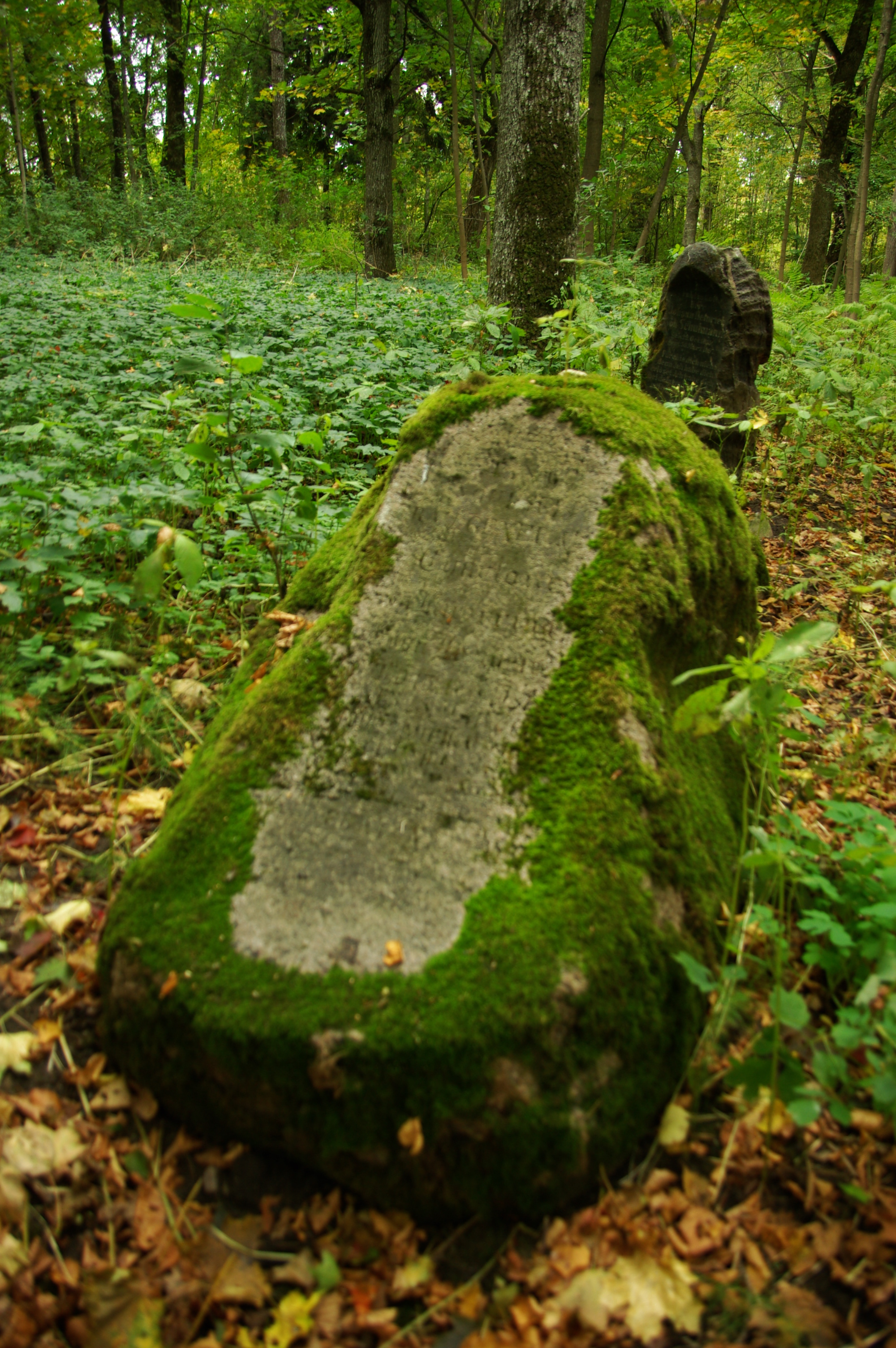

Mõigu cemetery (German: Friedhof von Moik or Kirchhof von Moik, Estonian: Mõigu kalmistu) was a large Baltic German cemetery, located in the Tallinn suburb of Mõigu in Estonia. It served as the primary burial ground for the usually wealthy and noble citizens of the Toompea parish of Tallinn. Containing numerous graves, it stood for over 170 years from 1774 to shortly after World War II when it was completely flattened and destroyed by the Soviet occupation authorities governing the country at that time.

Its origins and destruction are very similar to that of the Kopli cemetery (also in Tallinn).

== Origins 1771–1774 ==
Between 1771 and 1772, Catherine the Great, empress of the Russian Empire, issued an edict which decreed that, from that point on, any person who died (regardless of their social standing or class origins), no longer had the right to be buried within church crypts or adjacent churchyards. New cemeteries had to be built across the entire Russian empire, and from then on they all had to be located outside city limits.

One of the main motivations behind these measures was overcrowding in church crypts and graveyards. However the true deciding factor which led to the new laws being enforced on such a mass scale across the entire Russian empire was to avoid further outbreaks of highly contagious diseases, especially the black plague which had led to the Plague Riot in Moscow in 1771.

Against this background the cemetery at Mõigu was founded in 1774 on the outskirts of Tallinn on an area that was owned and administered by the Toompea cathedral of Tallinn. It served as a burial ground for over 170 years for Baltic Germans who lived and died in the Toompea parish of Tallinn between 1774 and 1944.

== Destruction by Soviet authorities after 1945 ==
Around 1950–1951 the cemetery was entirely flattened by Soviet occupation authorities. Gravestones were used to build walls along the ports and sidewalks in other parts of the city and no trace of the cemetery was left standing.

The Soviet forces, in a coordinated effort to remove all traces of the past, non-ethnic Russian inhabitants of Tallinn also destroyed two other 16th and 18th century cemeteries in the city, in the suburbs of Kopli and Kalamaja which belonged to the ethnic Estonian and Baltic German communities.

In contrast the Russian Orthodox Cemetery, also established in the 18th century, south of the old town of Tallinn, was left standing.

== Current status ==
The only surviving evidence of those who were interred there consists of the parish registers of burials and some old detailed maps of the area in the Tallinn city archives.

The area of the former cemetery today lies abandoned, however Estonian authorities are planning a conservation of the area.

== See also ==
- List of cemeteries in Estonia
- Nazi-Soviet population transfers

== Sources ==
- Adolf Richters. Baltische Verkehrs- und Adreßbücher, Band 3-Estland, Riga 1913
- (in German) Schmidt, Christoph. Bergengruens Tod von Reval aus historischer Sicht. Journal of Baltic Studies, 29:4 (1998), 315–325
- Tallinna Kalmistud, Karl Laane, Tallinn, 2002, ISBN 9985-64-168-X
