= Kopli cemetery =

Cemetery in Tallinn, Estonia

Coordinates: 59°27′12.66″N 24°41′6.13″E

Kopli kalmistu
- Interactive map of Kopli kalmistu

Details
- Established: 1774
- Location: Tallinn
- Country: Estonia
- Type: not extant
- No. of graves: unknown

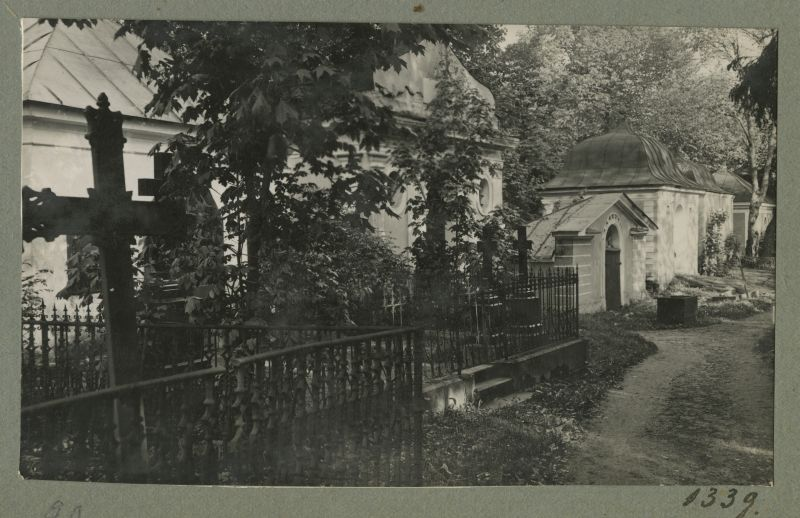
Kopli cemetery, c. 1920

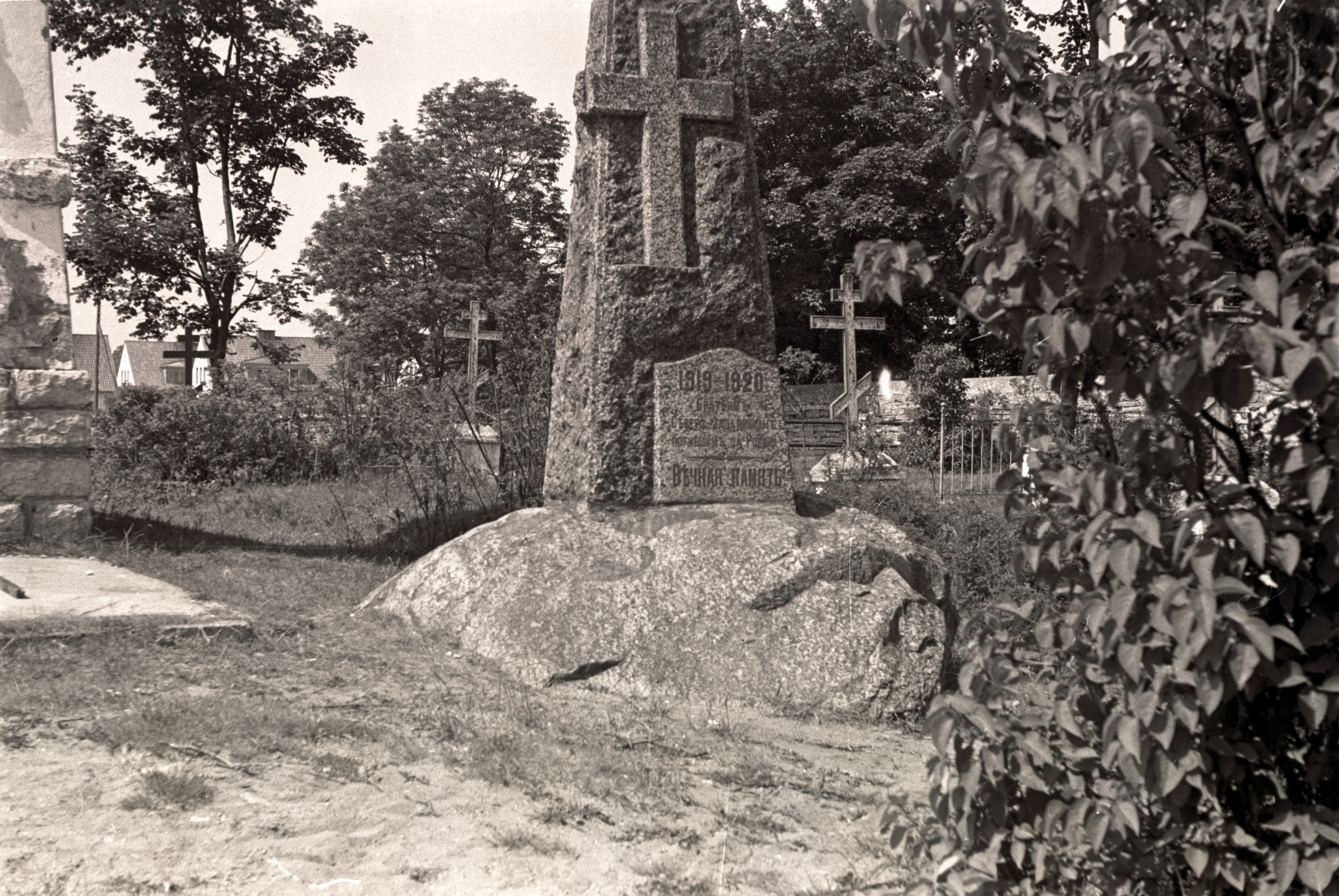
Memorial to the soldiers of Northwestern Army (Russia) fallen in 1918-1920

The Kopli cemetery (German: Friedhof von Ziegelskoppel or Kirchhof von Ziegelskoppel; Estonian: Kopli kalmistu) was Estonia's largest Lutheran Baltic German cemetery, located in the suburb of Kopli in Tallinn. It contained thousands of graves of prominent citizens of Tallinn and stood from 1774 to shortly after World War II, when it was completely flattened and destroyed by the Soviet occupation authorities governing the country at the time. The former cemetery is now a public park.

== Origins and use ==
Between 1771 and 1772, Catherine the Great, empress of the Russian Empire, issued an edict which decreed that from that point on, no-one who died (regardless of their social standing or class origins) was to be buried in a church crypt or churchyard; all burials were to take place in new cemeteries to be built throughout Russia, located outside town boundaries.

These measures were intended to overcome the congestion of urban church crypts and graveyards, and were prompted by a number of outbreaks of highly contagious diseases linked to inadequate burial practices in urban areas, especially the black plague, which had led to the 1771 Plague Riot in Moscow.

The cemetery at Kopli was founded in 1774 on the outskirts of Tallinn. It was divided into two sections: the western part was used for the deceased belonging to the St. Nicholas' Church parish, while the eastern part was reserved for those of the St. Olaf's Church parish.

The cemetery served as a burial ground for over 170 years for almost all Baltic Germans who died in the city between 1774 and 1944. In 1939, it contained thousands of well-kept graves of many prominent citizens of Tallinn.

Since 1921, on the southern outskirts of the cemetery, there was a burial place for the lower ranks and officers of the Russian Northwestern Army, who died in the typhoid hospitals after the end of the Russian Civil War and Estonian War of Independence. Since 1936, the St. George Chapel by the architect A.I. Vladovsky has stood on the territory of the cemetery, which was destroyed in Soviet times and restored in 2022.

== Final burials ==
Burials at the cemetery were drastically reduced after Adolf Hitler's forced transfer, under the Molotov–Ribbentrop Pact, of tens of thousands of Baltic Germans from Estonia and Latvia to areas in western Poland in late 1939.

Burials at the cemetery continued on a much smaller scale until 1944, principally among those Baltic Germans who had refused to leave the region.

== Destruction by Soviet authorities ==
Shortly after World War II, during the second occupation of Baltic states, several Soviet military bases were established in the suburb of Kopli, and the entire area was turned into a restricted zone and closed to the general public.

Around 1950–1951, the cemetery was entirely flattened by Soviet authorities. Gravestones were used to build walls along the ports and sidewalks in other parts of the city and no trace of the cemetery was left standing.

Soviet administration also destroyed two further 17th- and 18th-century cemeteries in the city, in Kalamaja and Mõigu, which belonged to the ethnic Estonian and Baltic German communities.

In contrast, the Russian Orthodox Cemetery, also established in the 18th century, south of the Tallinn Old Town, was left untouched by the Soviet authorities.

== Current status ==
Presently, the former area of the cemetery is a public park, with no immediate visible indication of its previous status. The only surviving evidence of those who were interred there consists of the parish registers of burials and some old detailed maps of the area in the Tallinn city archives.

== The site of former cemetery (in the 21st century) ==
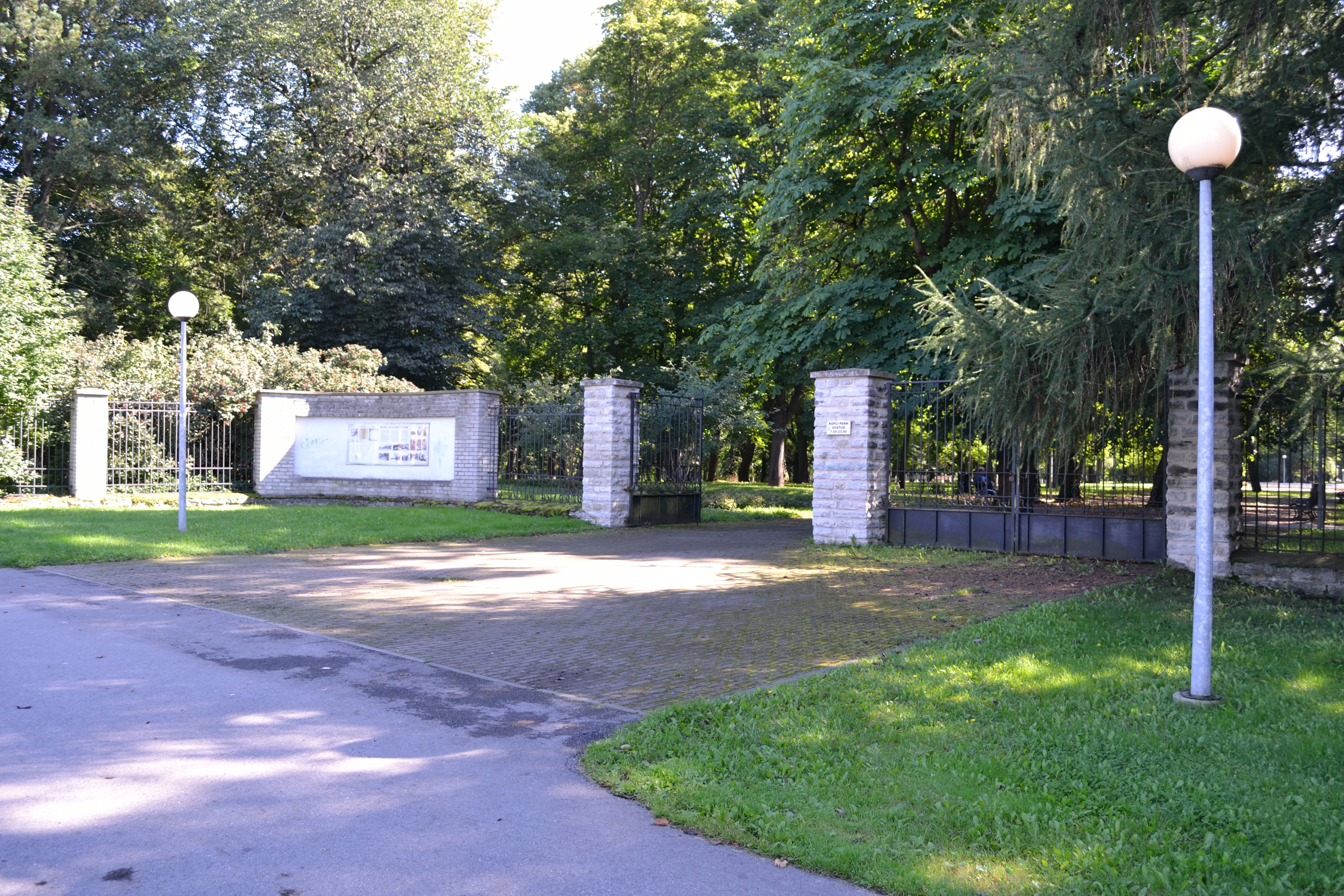

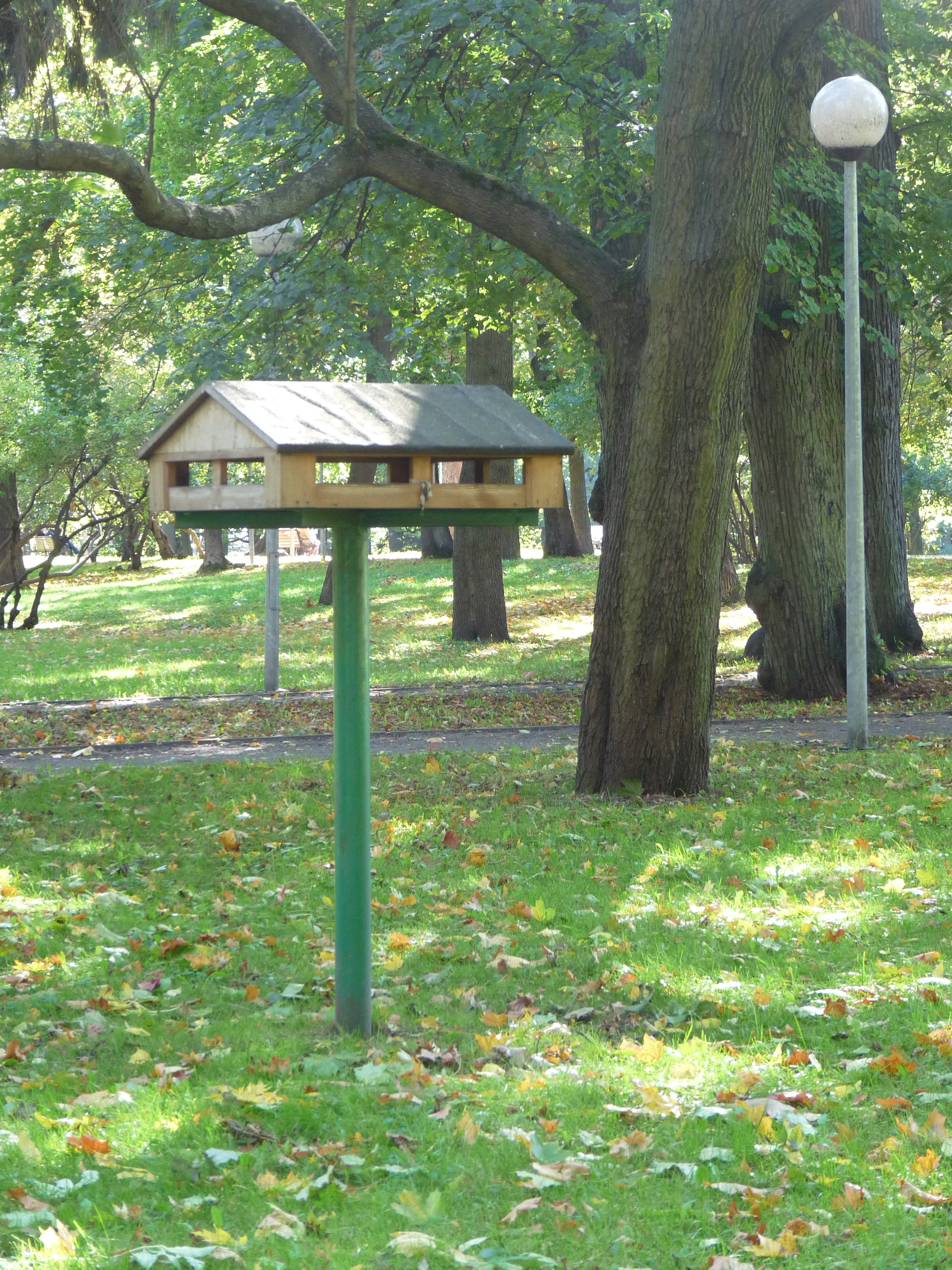

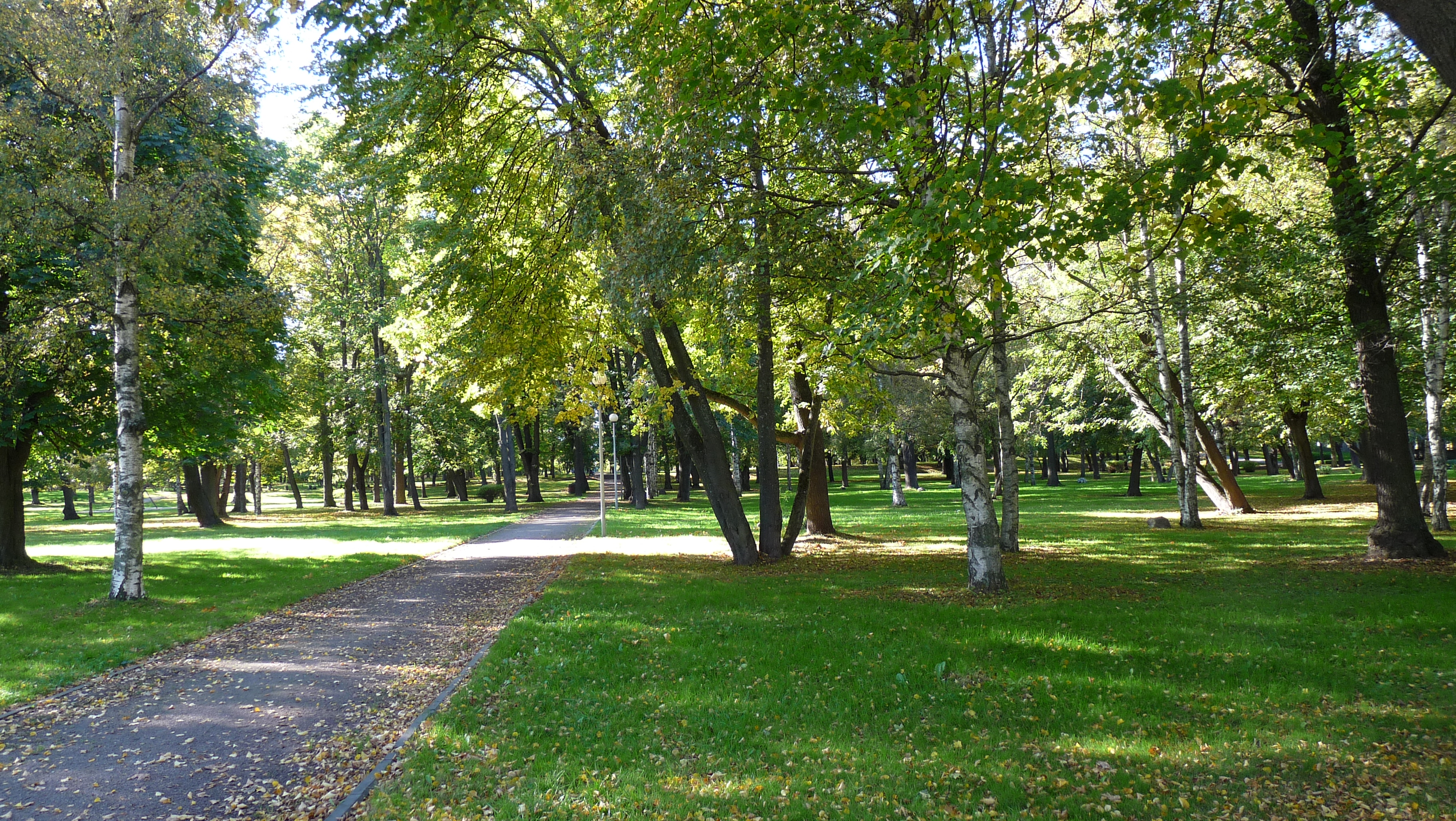

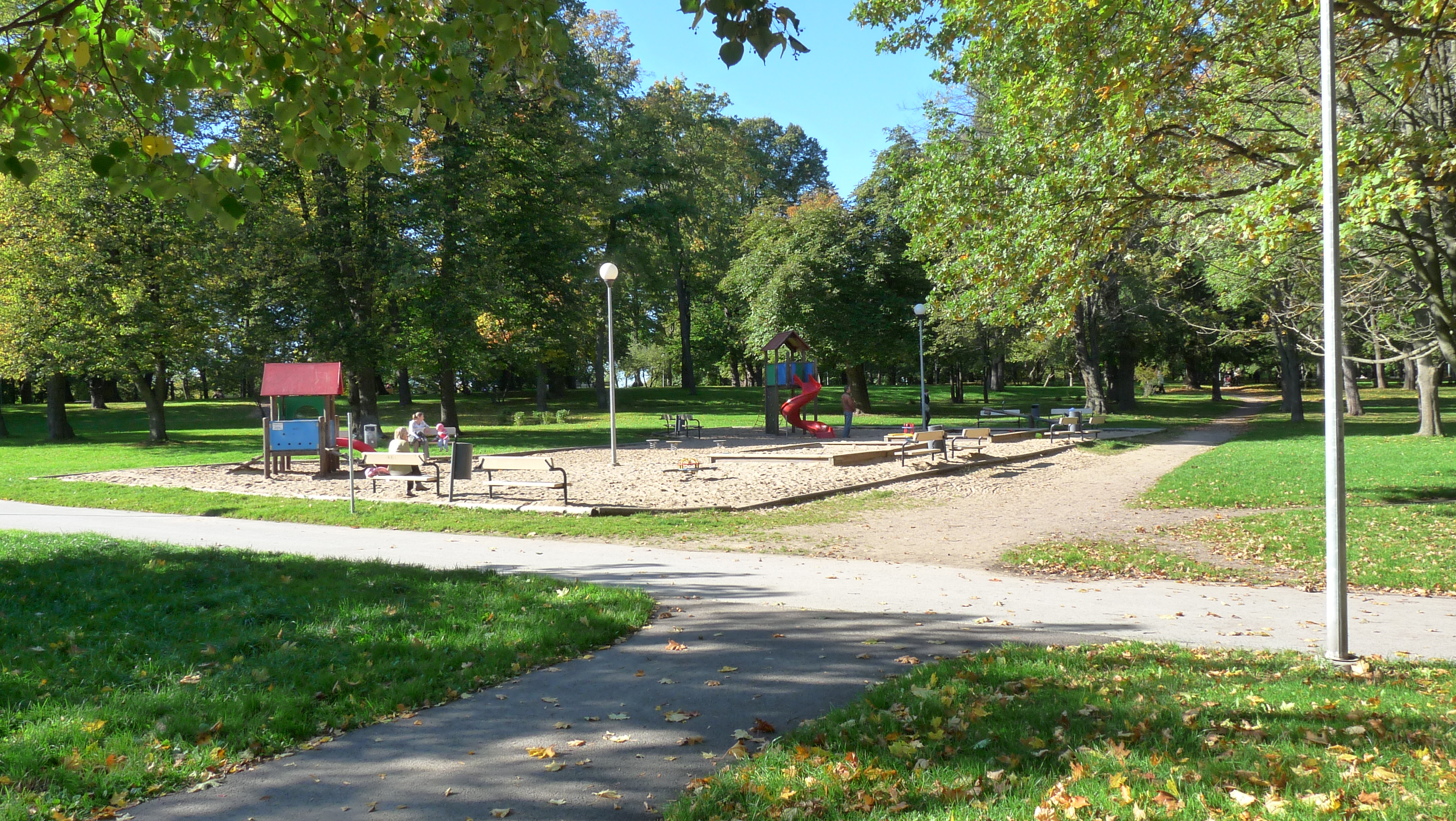

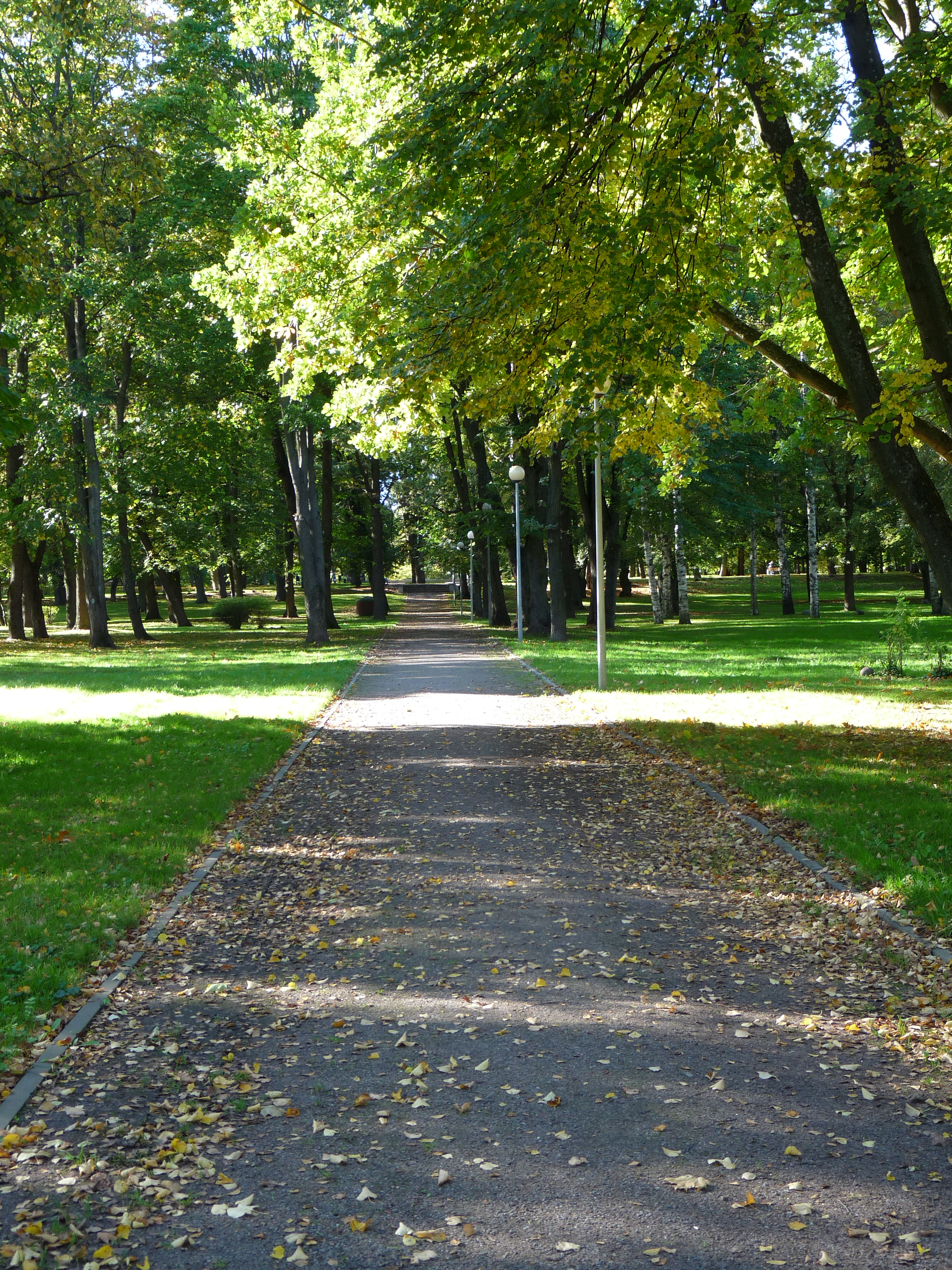

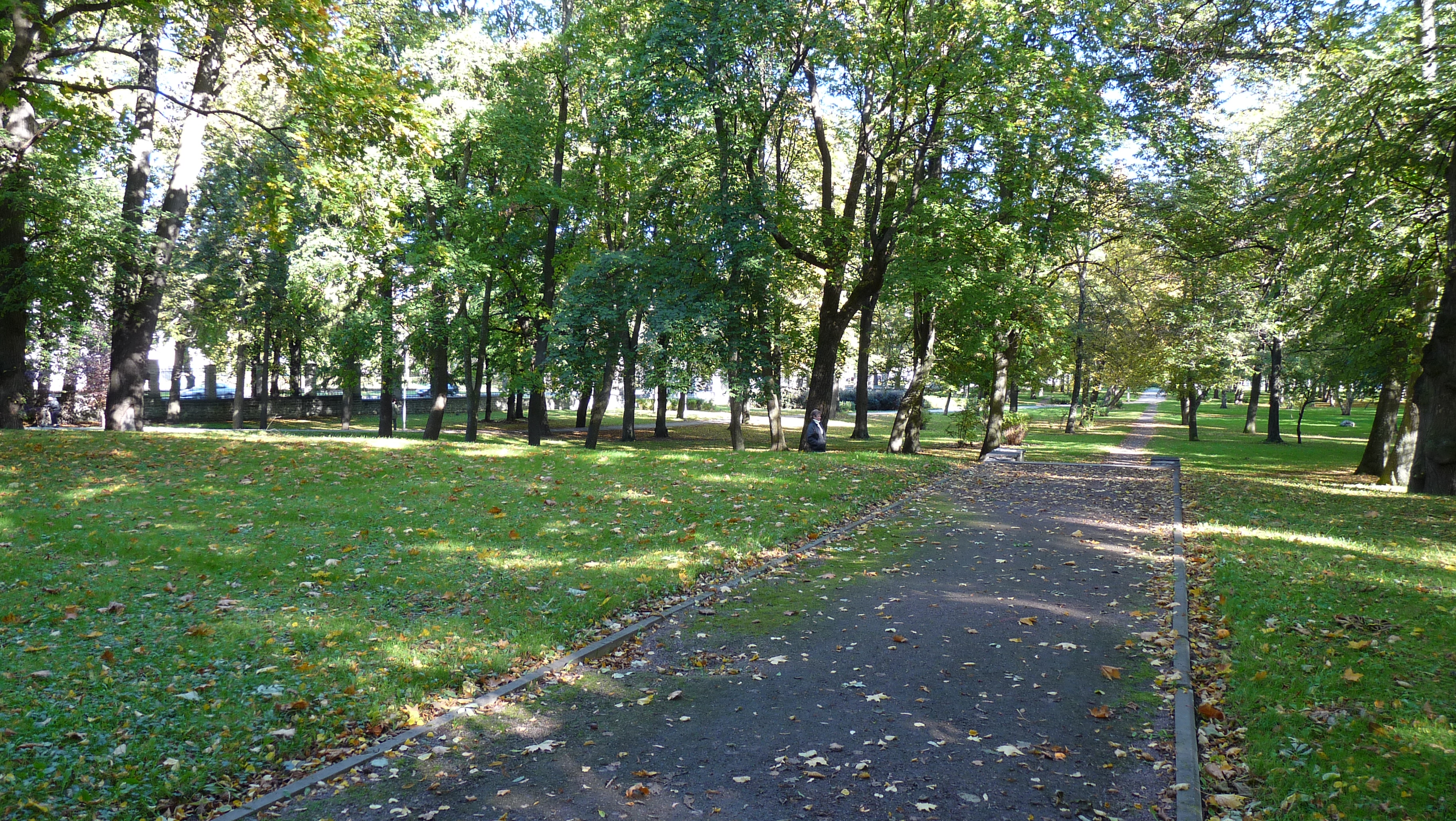

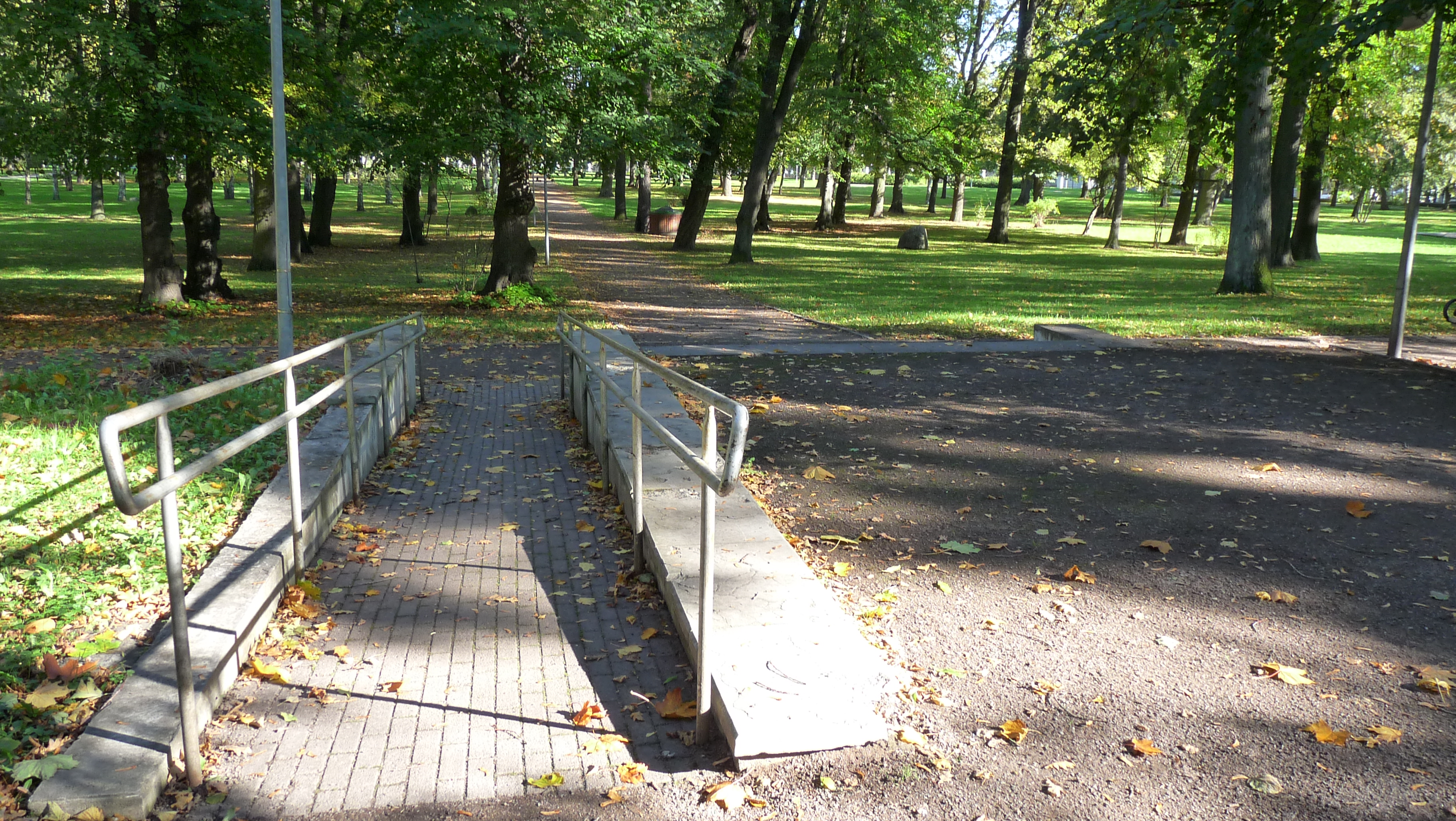

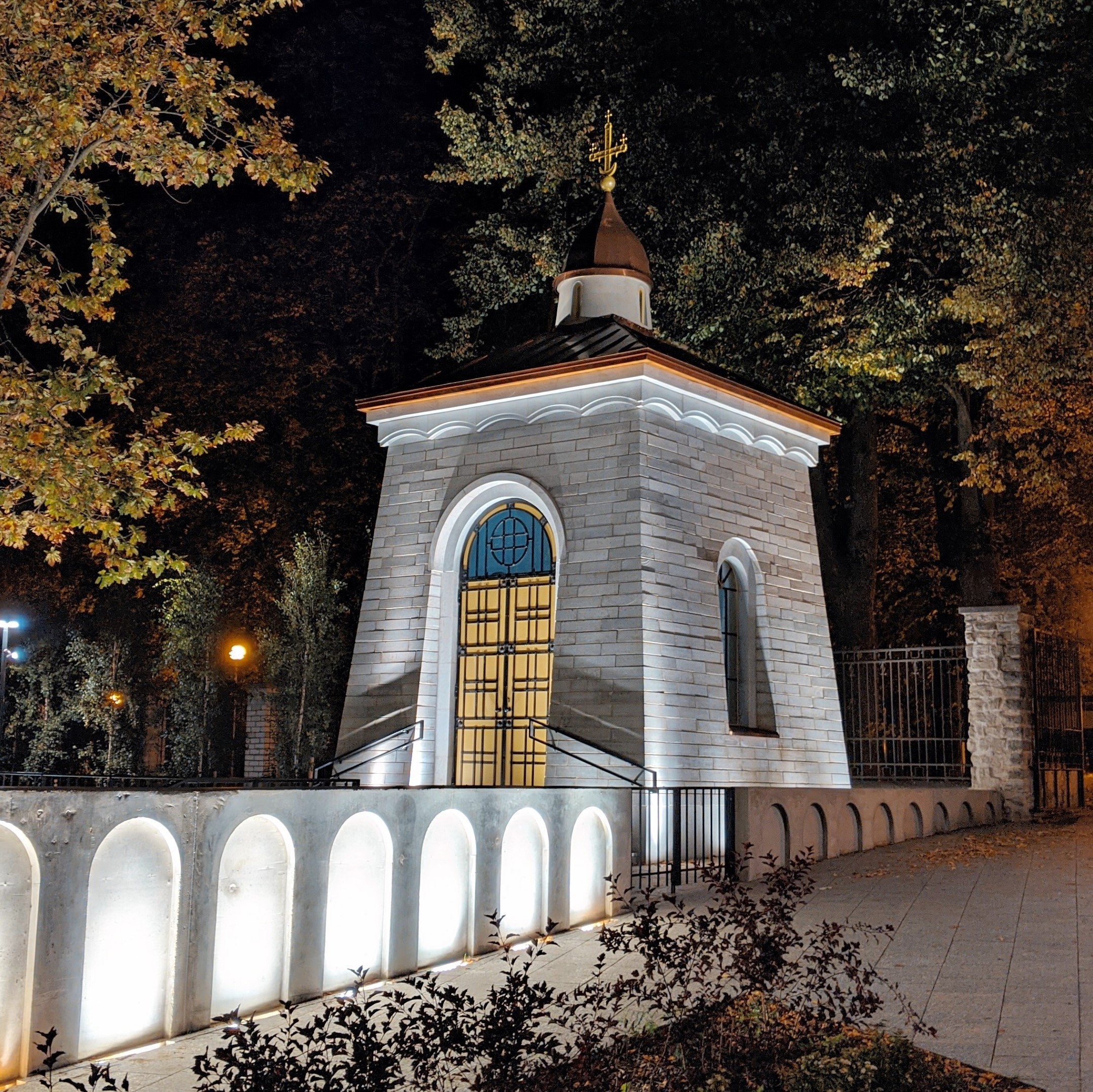

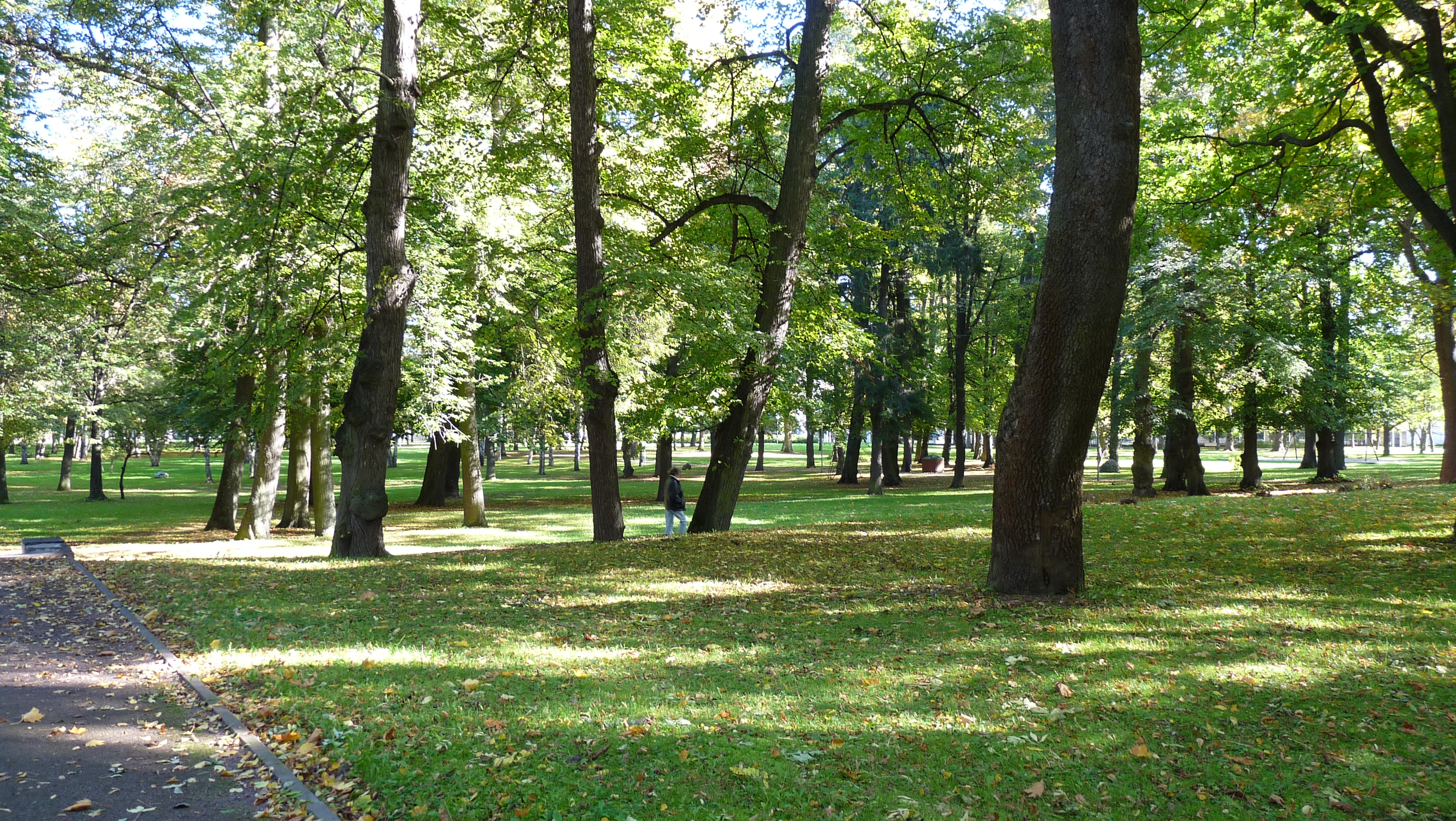

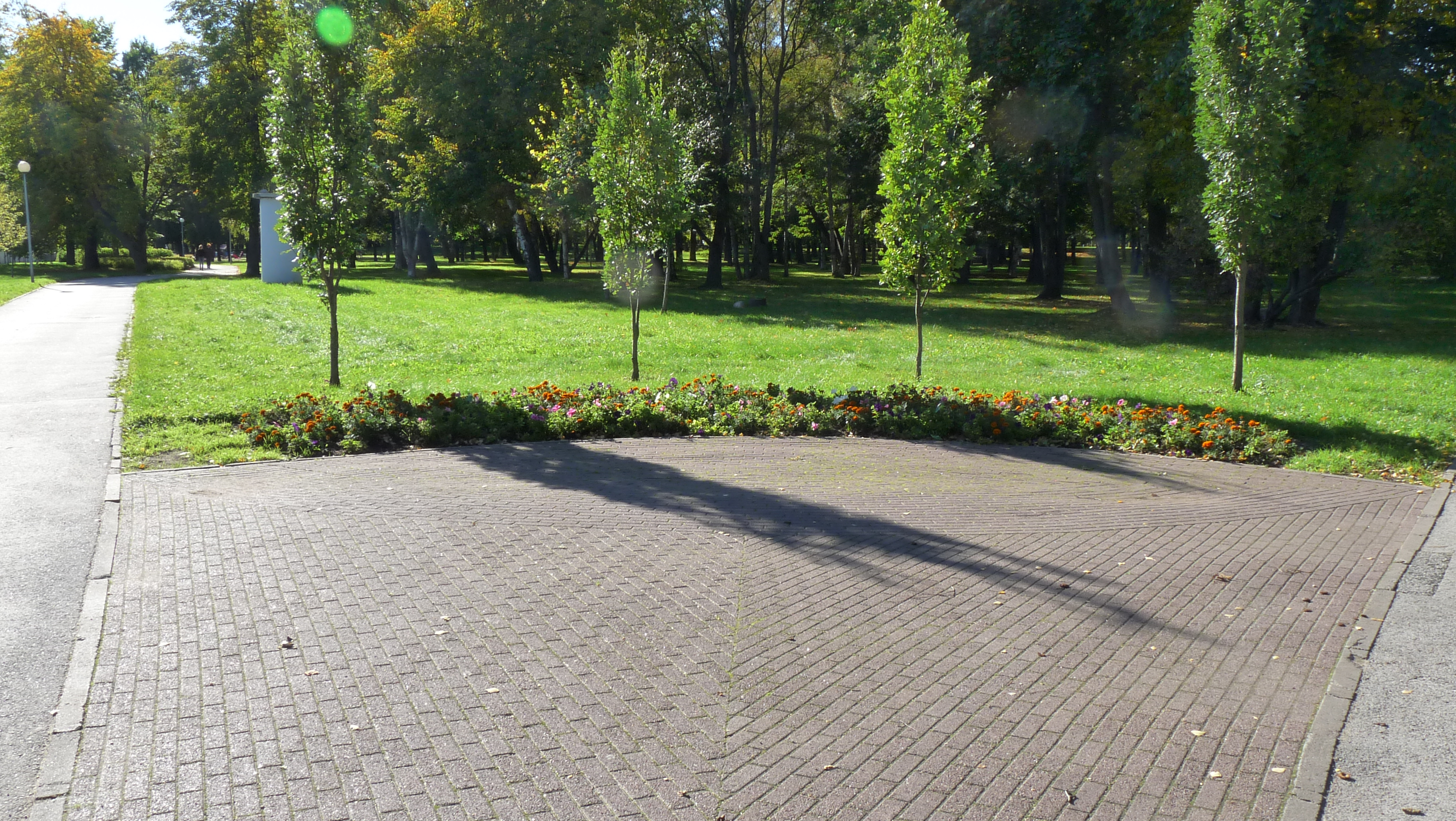

== Notable interments ==
- Eduard Bornhöhe (1862–1923), Estonian writer (reburied to Metsakalmistu)
- Various members of the Burchart family who owned and managed the Raeapteek in Tallinn
- Franz Kluge, publisher
- Artur Korjus (1870–1936), Estonian military officer, father of opera singer Miliza Korjus
- Karl von Kügelgen (1772–1832), Russian painter
- Lodewijk van Heiden (1773–1850), Dutch naval officer/Russian admiral
- Rudolf Carl Georg Lehbert (1858–1928), pharmacist and botanist
- Charles Leroux (1856–1889), American balloonist and parachutist
- Gertrud Elisabeth Mara (1749–1833), German opera singer
- Carl Julius Albert Paucker (1798–1856), Baltic German historian
- Netty Pinna (1883–1937), Estonian actress, wife of actor Paul Pinna (reburied to Metsakalmistu)
- Karl Friedrich Wilhelm Rußwurm (1812–1883), Baltic German historian, ethnographer and folklorist
- Aleksander Silberg (1869–1926), Estonian military Major-General
- Sophie Tieck (1775–1833), German writer and poet
- Konstantin Türnpu (1865–1927), Estonian composer, choirmaster and organist

== See also ==
- List of cemeteries in Estonia
- Mõigu cemetery
- Kalamaja cemetery
- Raadi cemetery
- Great Cemetery (Riga)
- Nazi-Soviet population transfers
- Baltic Germans

== References in literature ==
The cemetery features several times in the short story collection Death from Reval (Der Tod von Reval) by the Baltic German author Werner Bergengruen.

- (in German) Adolf Richters Baltische Verkehrs- und Adreßbücher, Band 3-Estland, Riga 1913
- (in German) Schmidt, Christoph. Bergengruens Tod von Reval aus historischer Sicht. Journal of Baltic Studies, 29:4 (1998), 315–325
- (in Estonian) Tallinna Kalmistud, Karl Laane, Tallinn, 2002. ISBN 998564168X
