= Mõigu =

Subdistrict of Tallinn, Estonia

Coordinates: 59.4063066°N 24.8125792°E

- Subdistrict of Tallinn
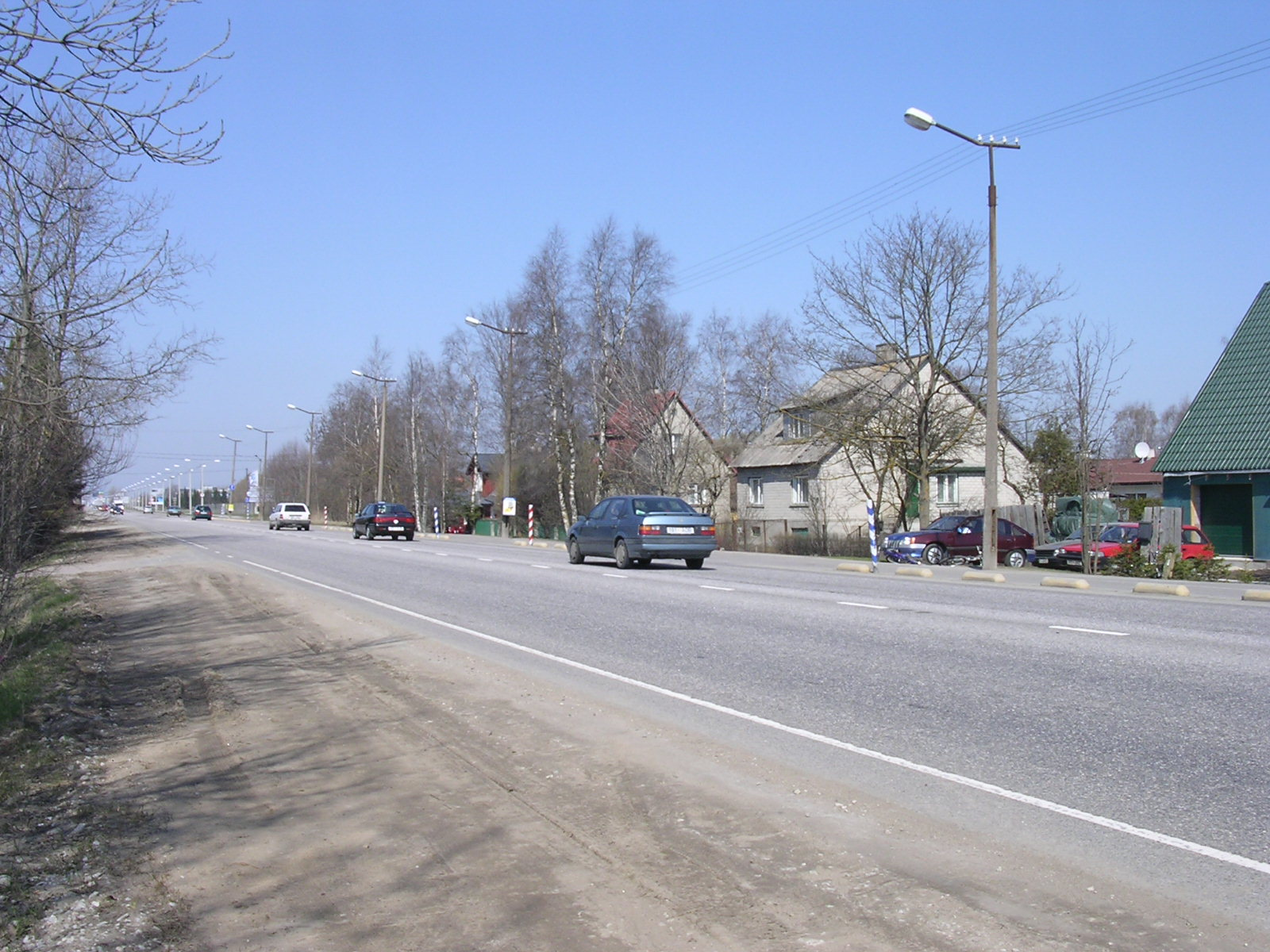
- Tartu road in Mõigu.

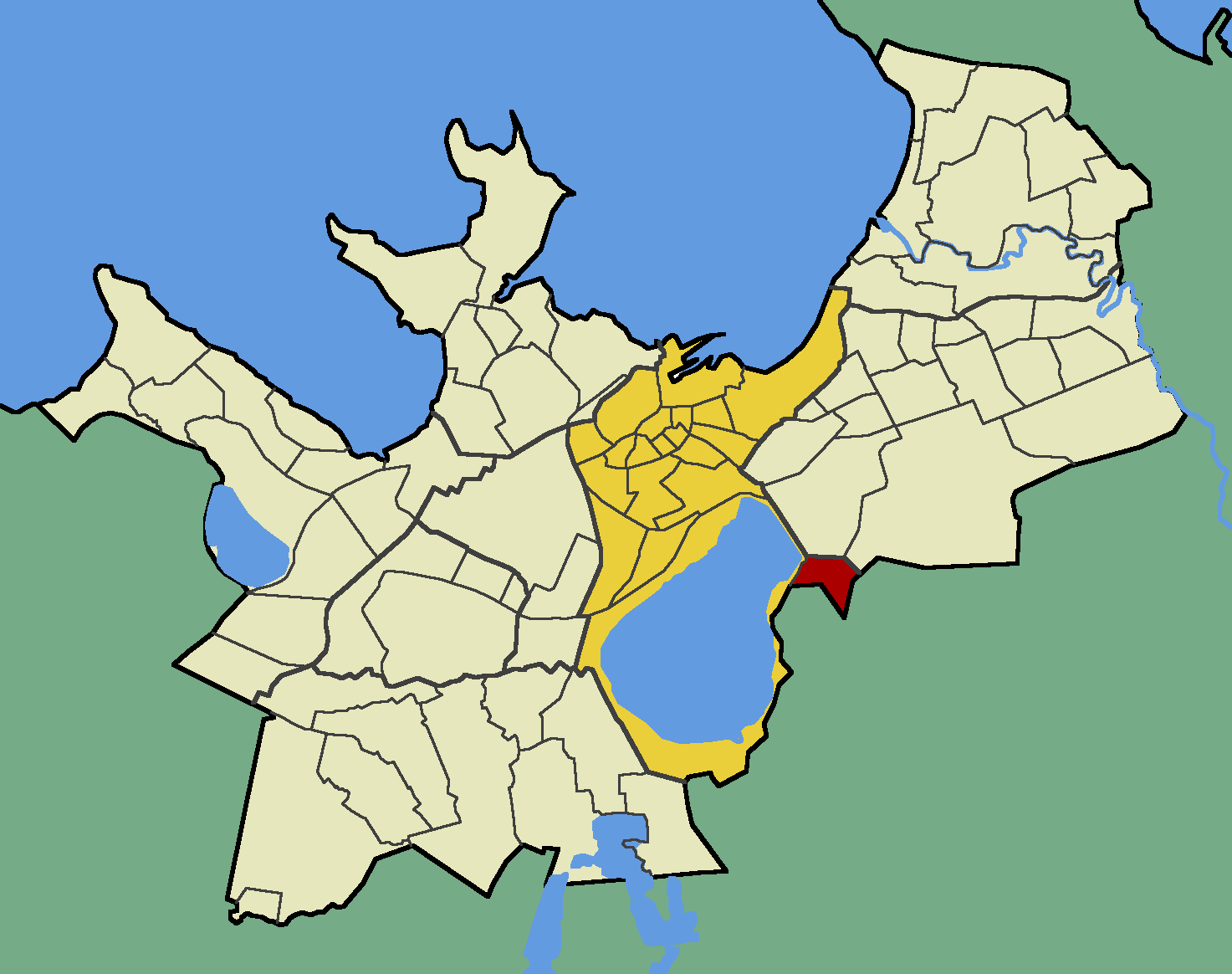
- Mõigu within the district of Kesklinn (Midtown).
- Country: Estonia
- County: Harju County
- City: Tallinn
- District: Kesklinn

Population (01.01.2014)
  - Total: 377

Mõigu is a subdistrict of the district of Kesklinn (Town Center) in Tallinn, the capital of Estonia. It is located on the northeastern side of Lake Ülemiste. It has a population of 377 (As of 1 January 2014). Mõigu's former German name until 1918 was Moik, also spelled Moick.

Mõigu village was first time mentioned in written in 1241 in Liber Census Daniæ under name of Møickæ. The village in that time situated few kilometres south-east from current Mõigu subdistrict of Tallinn.

At the end of 16th century a Mõigu manor (Moik, Moick) was founded at the farm-plot of a peasant called Vana Jaan (Old Jaan) at the territory of Mõigu village. About a century later the manor was moved to this-time Järveküla village. This caused exchanging the names of the villages, as inhabitants of (former) Järveküla were moved to Mõigu while the manor was moved from Mõigu to Järveküla, and both sides took their place-name with them. Therefore, the heart of current Järveküla (literally: Lake-village) is about kilometre off from the Lake Ülemiste while Mõigu manor is still standing just 100 metres from the coast of the lake.

Mõigu as a separate hamlet existed until the 1970s, then most of its territory was incorporated into neighbouring Peetri village.

== Cemetery in Mõigu ==
Mõigu was the former location of a large Baltic German burial ground in Tallinn, known as Mõigu cemetery (in Estonian: Mõigu kalmistu; in German: der Friedhof von Moik) which was founded around 1774. The cemetery was flattened over a 170 years later around 1950–1951, during the second occupation of the Baltic states, by Russian Soviet authorities governing the Estonian SSR at the time.

== See also ==
- Tallinn Airport
