= Gertrud Elisabeth Mara =

German operatic soprano (1749–1833)

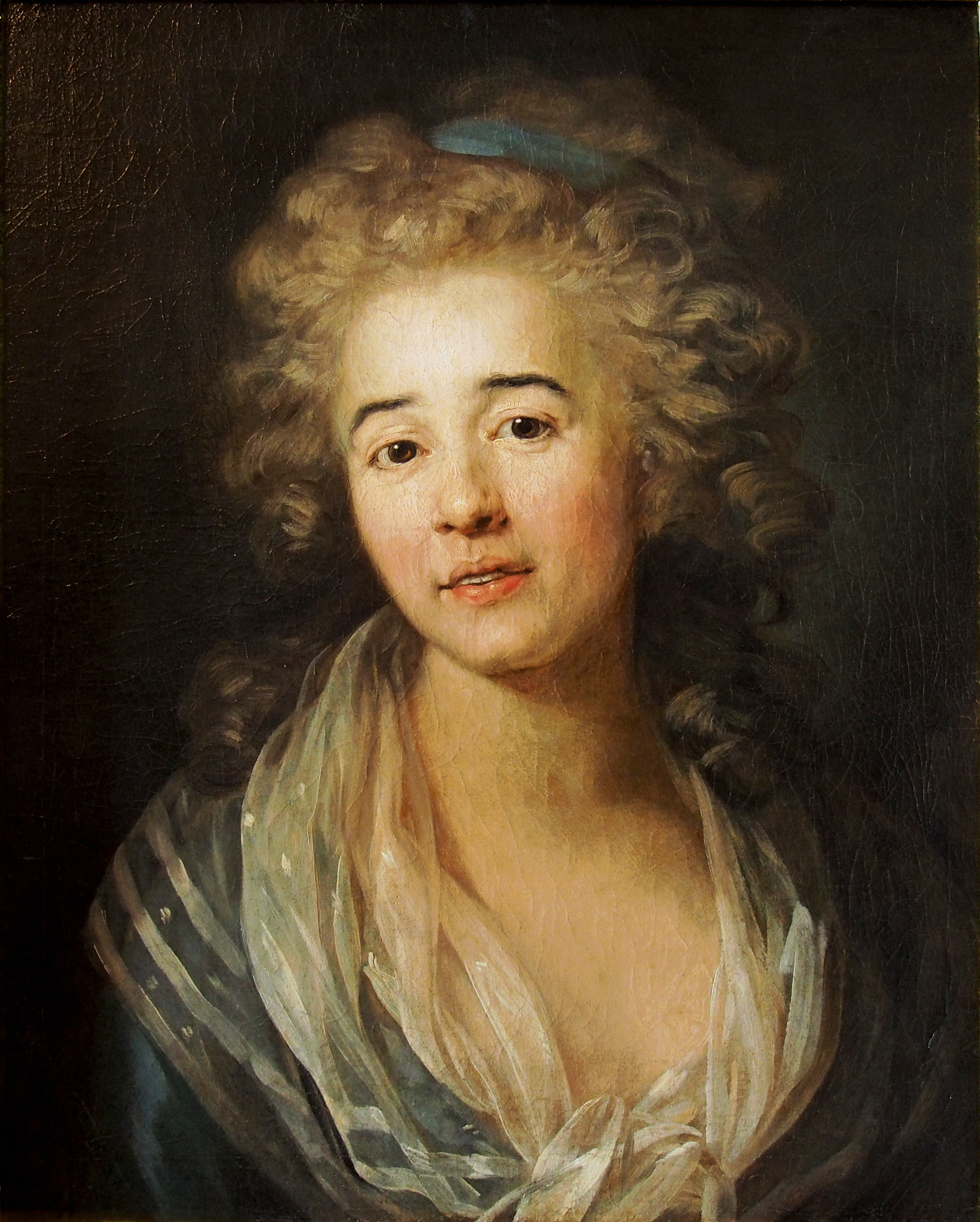
- Portrait by Anton Graff, c. 1790
- Born: Gertrud Elisabeth Schmeling; 23 February 1749; Kassel, Germany
- Died: 20 January 1833 (aged 83); Reval (now Tallinn), Estonia
- Occupation: operatic soprano

Gertrud Elisabeth Mara (née Schmeling) (23 February 1749 – 20 January 1833) was a German operatic soprano.

== Life ==
Gertrude was born in Kassel, the daughter of a poor musician, Johann Schmeling. From him she learnt to play the violin, and while still a child, her playing at the fair at Frankfurt was so remarkable that money was collected to provide for her. She took singing lessons under Pietro Domenico Paradisi. She was helped by influential friends, and studied under Johann Adam Hiller in Leipzig for five years, alongside Corona Schröter, proving to be endowed with a wonderful soprano voice.

She began to sing in public in 1771, and was soon recognized as the greatest singer that Germany had produced. She was permanently engaged for the Prussian court in Berlin, but her marriage to a debauched cellist named Mara created difficulties, and in 1780 she was released. After singing in Vienna (where she was heard twice by Mozart), Munich and elsewhere, she appeared in Paris in 1782, where her rivalry with the singer Luísa Todi split the public into Todists and Maratists. In 1784, she went to London and continued to appear there with great success, with visits at intervals to Italy and to Paris until 1802, when for some years she retired to Russia, where she lost her fortune at the time of the French invasion. She visited England again in 1819, but then abandoned the stage.

She went to Livonia, where she became a music teacher in Reval, and died there in 1833 in extreme poverty; she was buried at Kopli cemetery.
