= Kalamaja Cemetery =

Former cemetery in Tallinn, Estonia

Coordinates: 59°26′58.43″N 24°43′47.88″E

Kalamaja Cemetery (Estonian: Kalamaja kalmistu, German: Fischermay Kirchhof or Fischermay Friedhof), in Tallinn, Estonia, was once the city's oldest existing cemetery, located in the suburb of Kalamaja in the north of the city. It contained thousands of graves of ethnic Estonian and Swedish residents of Tallinn and stood for at least 400 years, from the 16th century to 1964, when it was completely flattened and destroyed by the Soviet occupation authorities governing the country at that time.

The former cemetery is now a public park (Estonian: Kalamaja kalmistupark).

== Origins and use ==
The exact origins of the cemetery are not completely clear, but historians place its foundation to sometime between the 15th and 16th centuries. It was the principal burial ground of the lower-class ethnic Swedish and Estonians living in or around Tallinn.

Until the mid- to late 19th century, the majority of residents of Tallinn were Baltic Germans, who had their own separate graveyards within the city walls until 1774, and their own separate cemeteries outside the city after that.

The area of the cemetery was 6.7 hectares (17 acres) in 1940.

Until its destruction, the cemetery had tens of thousands of graves standing of various historical figures from Estonia's history.

== Current status ==
Presently the former area of the cemetery is a public park (Estonian: Kalamaja kalmistupark), with no immediate visible indication of its previous status. However a small plaque with a very short description has been installed at the site on the side of a restored bell tower.

The only surviving evidence of those that were interred there consists of the parish registers of burials and some old detailed maps of the area in the Tallinn city archives.

== Gallery ==
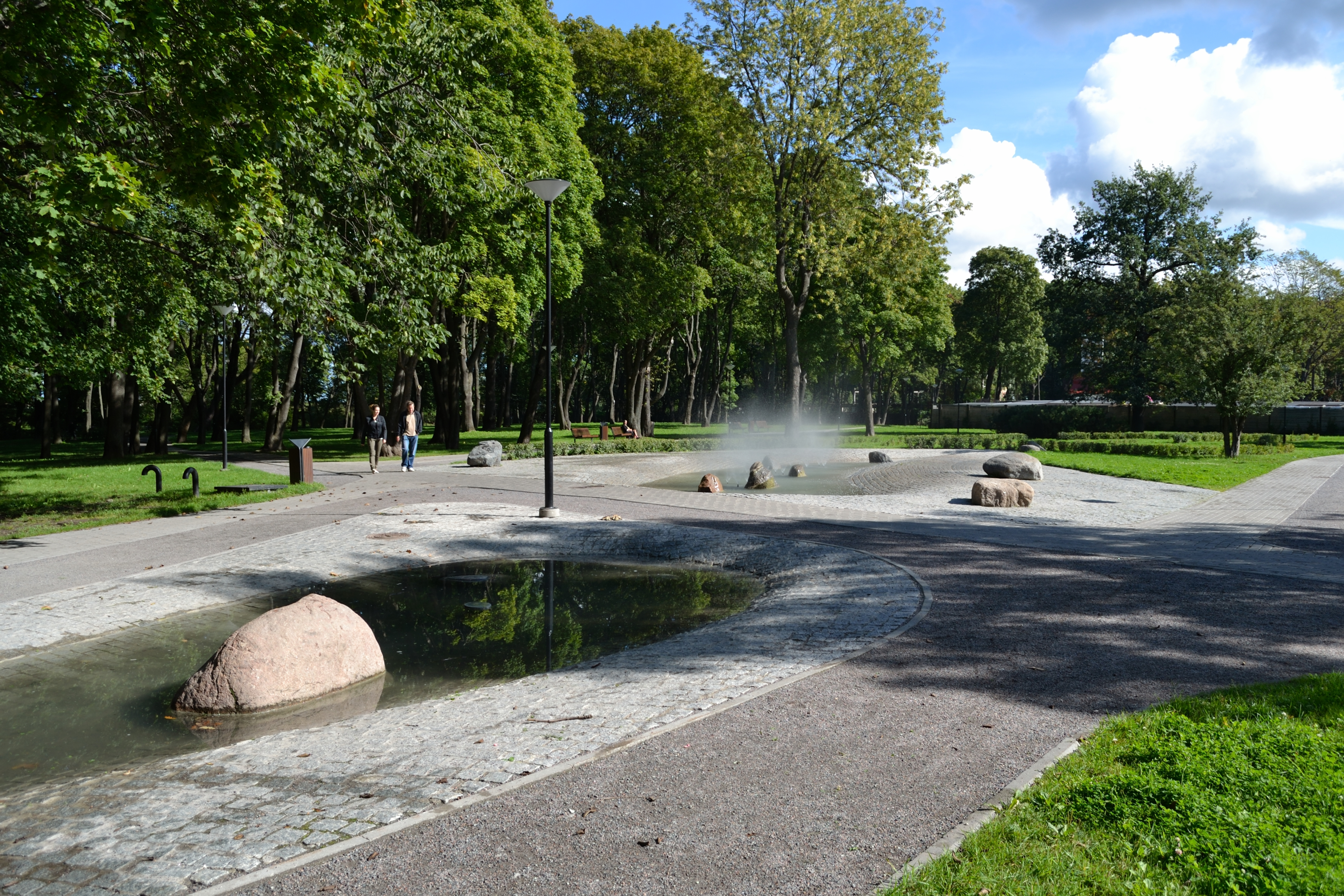
Fountain in newly reconstructed park

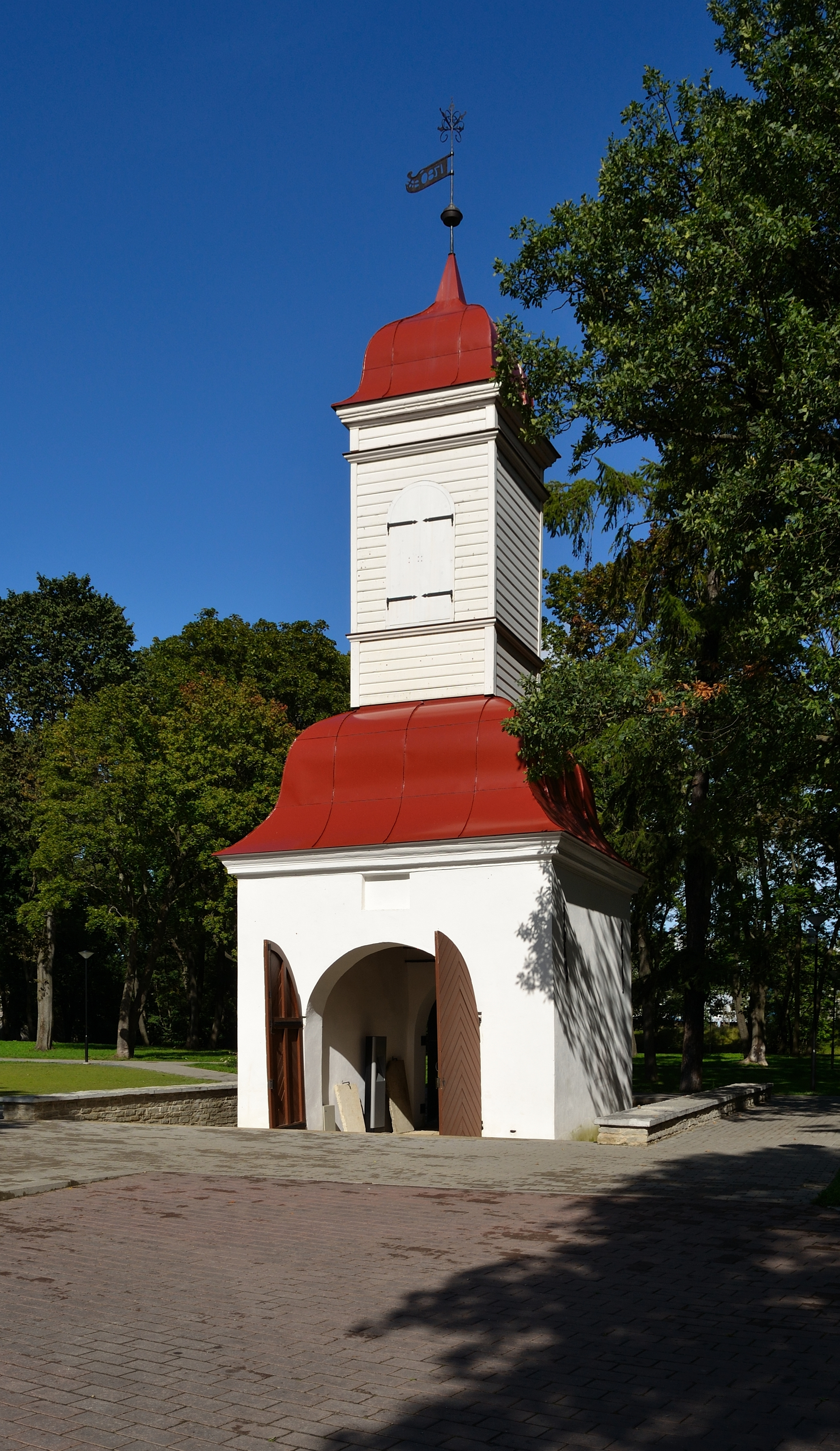
Surviving gate and bell tower from 1780

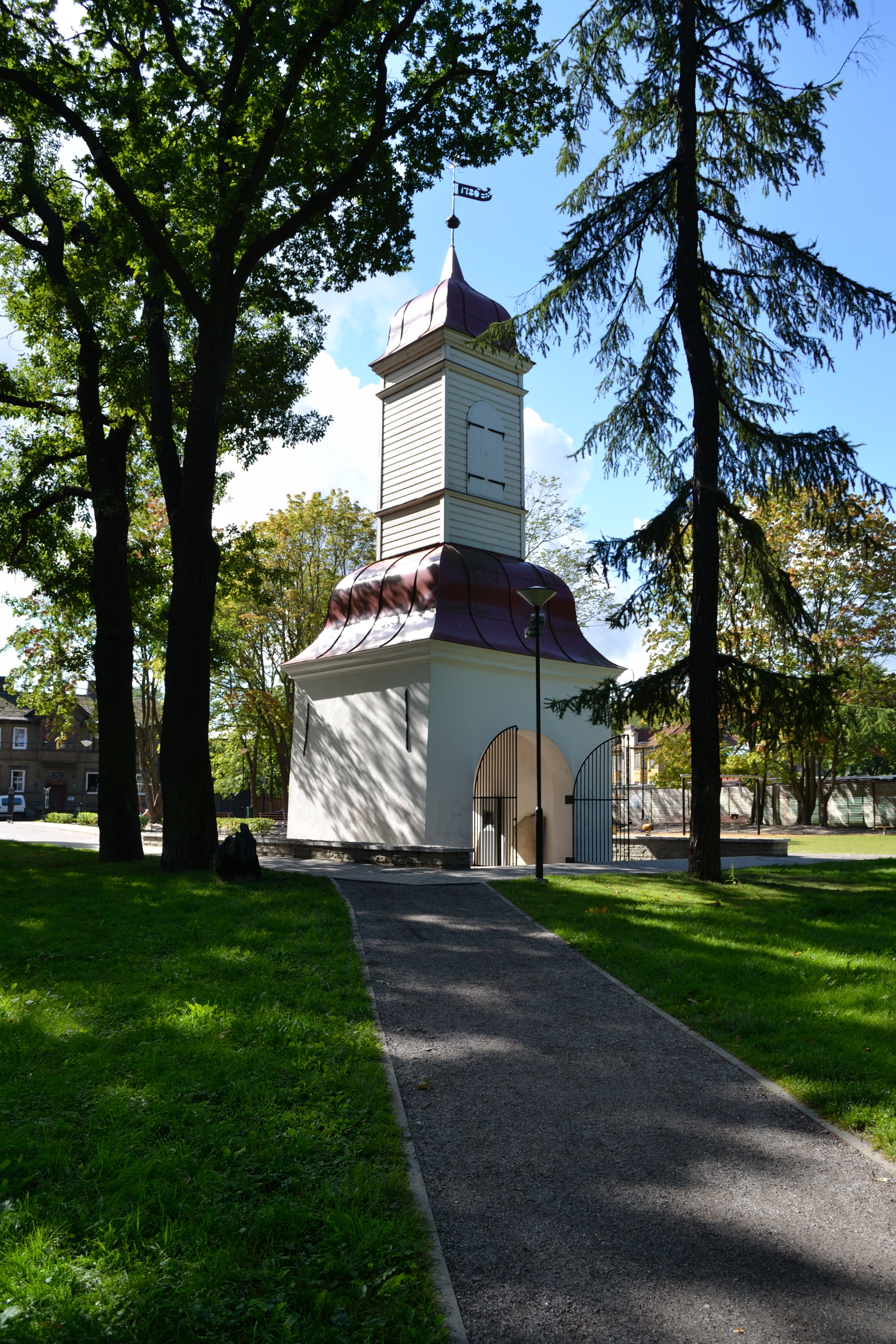
Bell tower

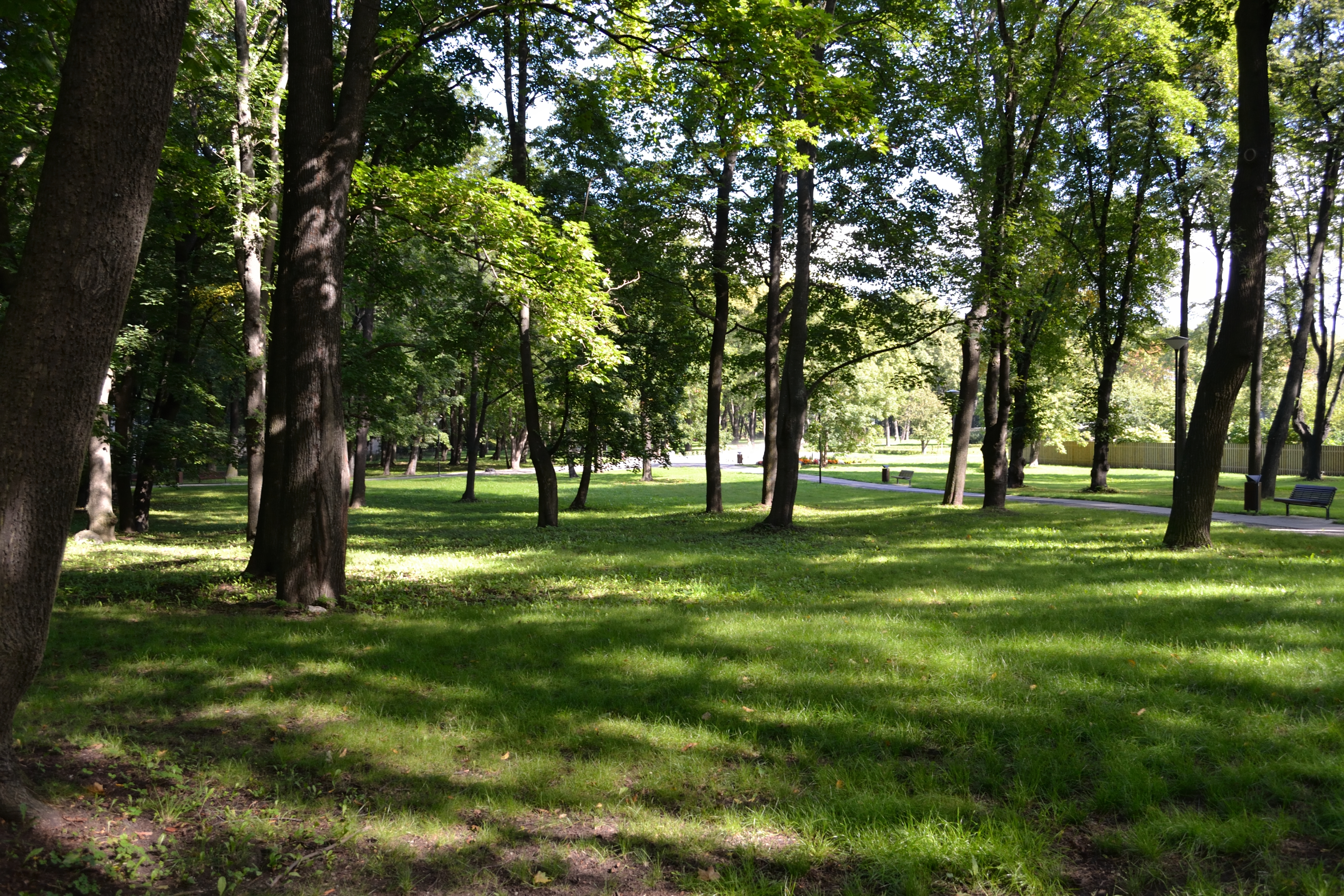

== See also ==
- List of cemeteries in Estonia
- Kopli cemetery
- Mõigu cemetery
