= Pärnu Alevi Cemetery =

Cemetery in Pärnu, Estonia

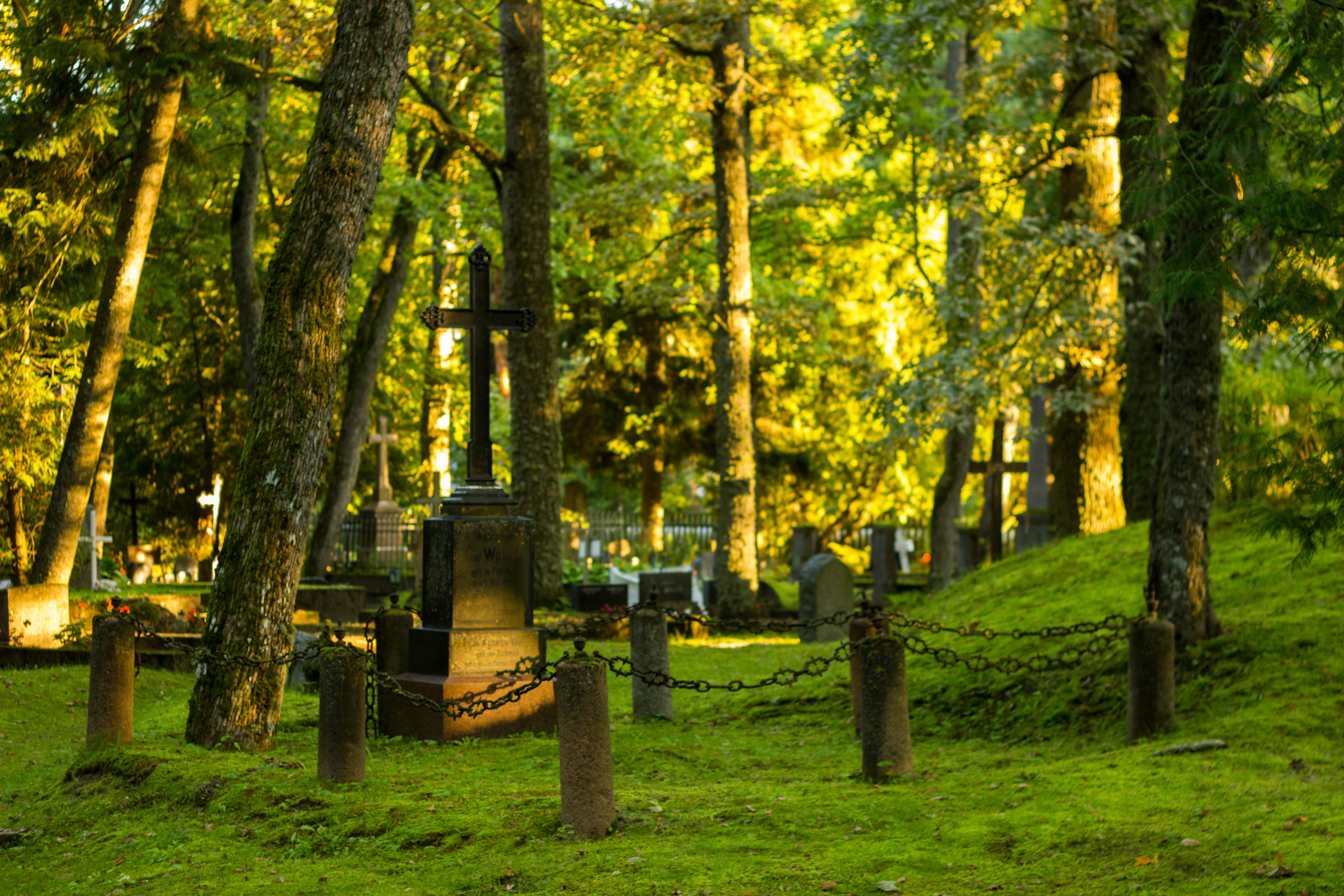
- Pärnu Alevi Cemetery
- Interactive map of Pärnu Alevi Cemetery

Details
- Established: 1773
- Location: Pärnu
- Country: Estonia
- Coordinates: 58°22′37″N 24°32′13″E

Pärnu Alevi Cemetery (Estonian: Pärnu Alevi kalmistu) is a cemetery in Pärnu, Estonia.

The cemetery was established in 1773.

== Notable burials ==
- Amandus Heinrich Adamson, Estonian sculptor and painter
- Johann Heinrich Rosenplänter, Baltic German linguist and Estophile
