= Hiiu-Rahu Cemetery =

Cemetery in Tallinn, Estonia

Coordinates: 59.3843°N 24.6665°E

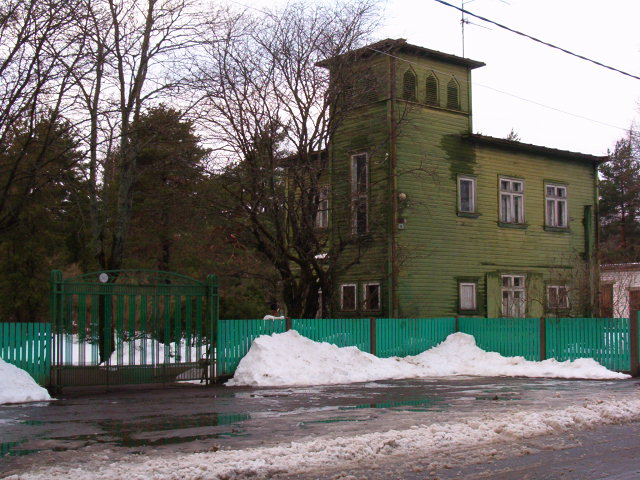
Entry to Hiiu-Rahu Cemetery

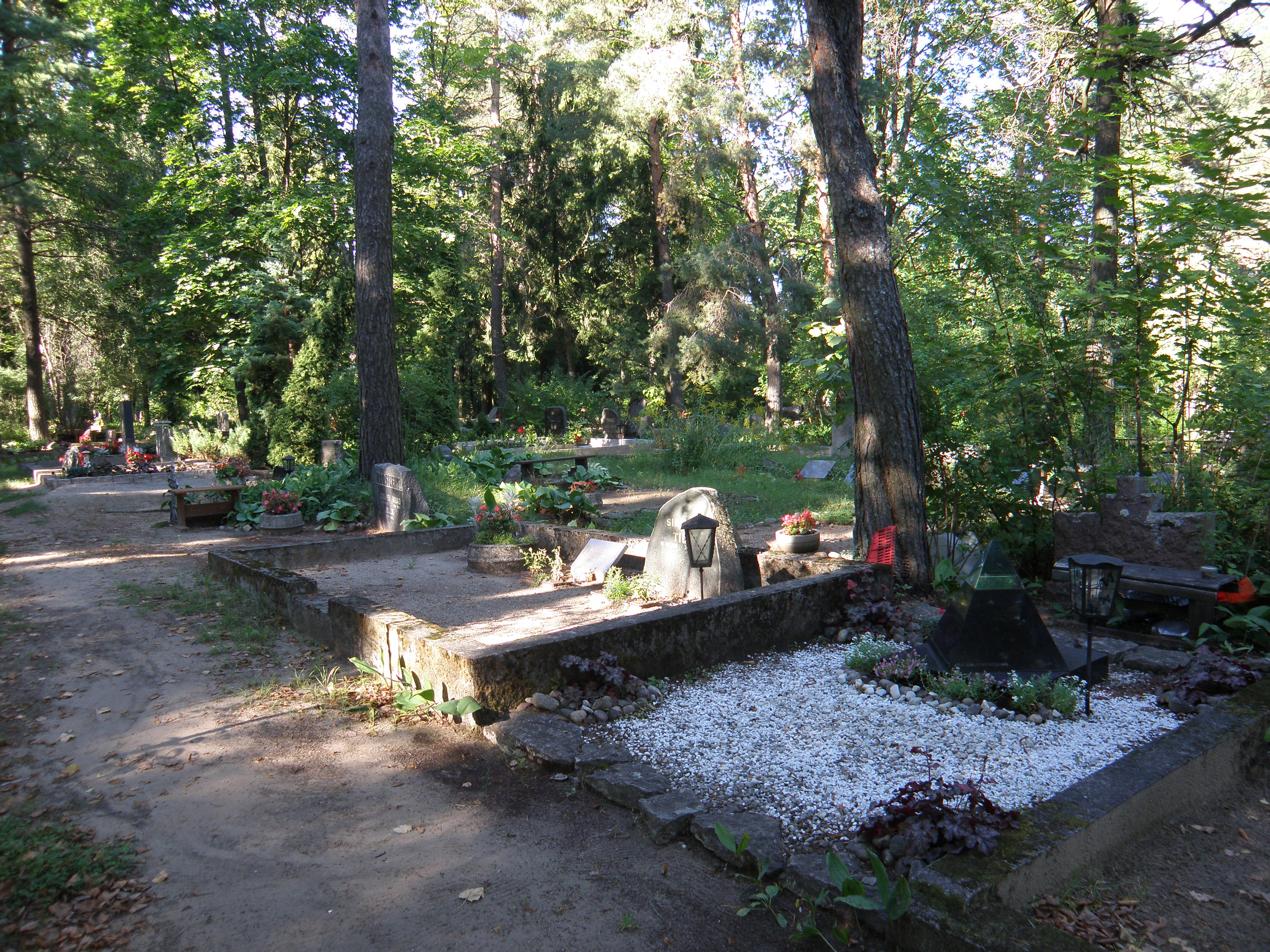
Hiiu-Rahu Cemetery

Hiiu-Rahu Cemetery is a cemetery in Tallinn, Estonia. The area of the cemetery is 2.2 ha, being one of the smallest cemetery in Tallinn.

The cemetery is established in 1919, but inaugurated as late as 1923. The cemetery was designed by Karl Burman.

== Notable interments ==
- Ernst Blumbach (1863–1929), hydrographer
- Peeter Grünfeldt (1865–1937), writer
- Juhan Kukk (1885–1942), statesman
- Rudolf Reimann (1884–1946), military personnel
- Julius Trubock, military personnel
- Voldemar Ilja (1922–2010), Lutheran clergyman, theologian and church historian
