= Vormsi Cemetery =

Cemetery in Estonia

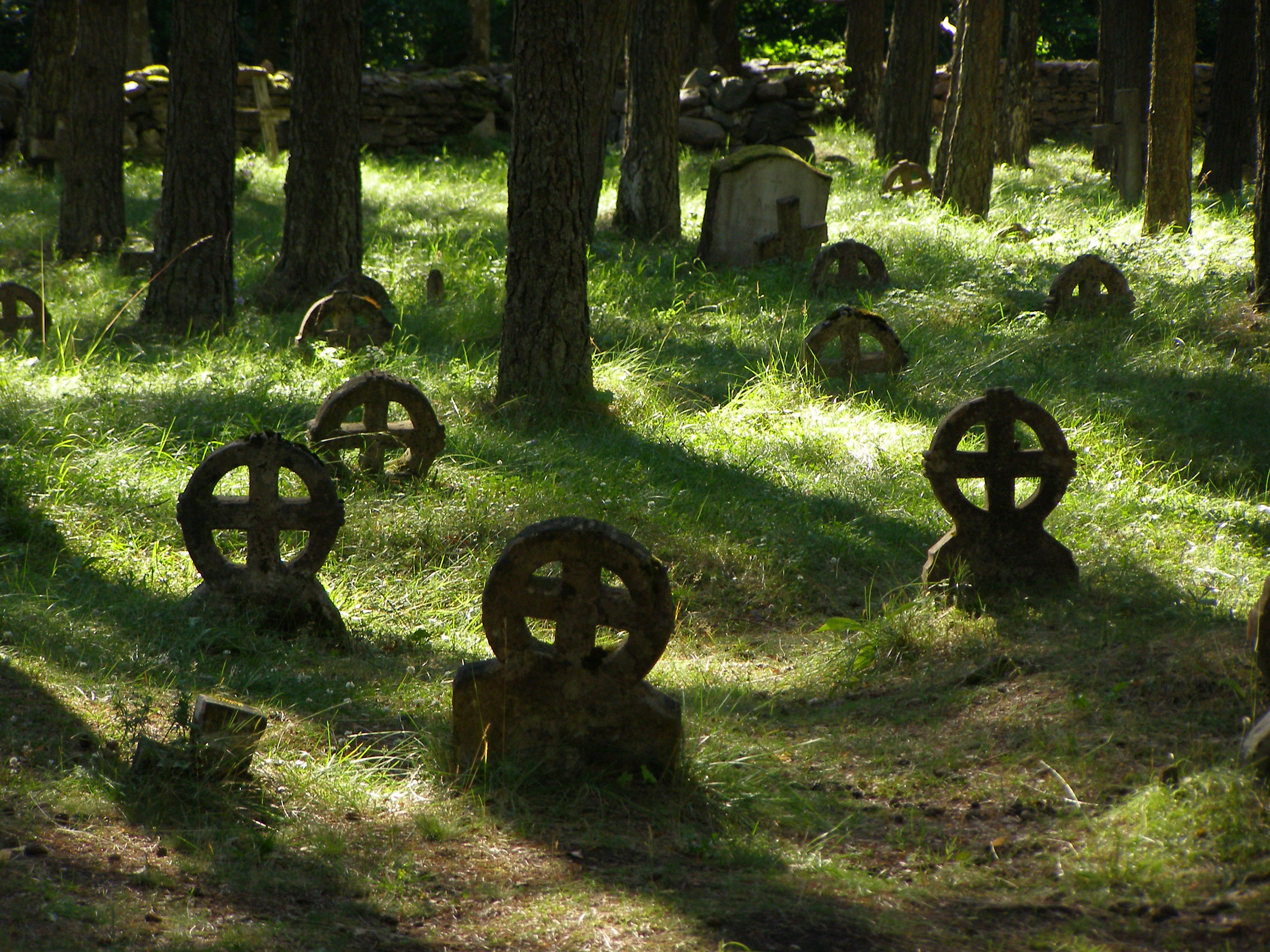
- Wheel crosses in the cemetery
- Interactive map of Vormsi Cemetery

Details
- Location: Vormsi
- Country: Estonia
- Coordinates: 59°00′04″N 23°13′52″E

Vormsi Cemetery (Estonian: Vormsi kalmistu) is a cemetery in Vormsi Island in Lääne County, Estonia.

The cemetery is located next to Vormsi St. Olav's Church. The cemetery's older part consists limestone and sandstone wheel crosses (Estonian: rõngasrist). In total, there are over 330 wheel crosses.

Notable burials:

- Hans Pöhl, Estonian politician, by nationality Estonian Swedes
