= AS Franz Krull =

Company based in Estonia

- Industry: Engineering; Metal works
- Founded: 1865 in Narva
- Founder: Franz Krull
- Fate: Nationalized
- Successor: Tallinna Masinatehas
- Headquarters: Tallinn, Estonia
- Products: Iron cast products Machinery

AS Franz Krull (German: Aktien-Gesellschaft der Maschinenfabrik "Franz Krull"; Russian: Акционерное общество машиностроительного завода "Франц Крулль") was a metal works and engineering company in Tallinn, Estonia. It was founded by the German industrialist Franz Krull in 1865 in Narva, and in 1875 it was moved to Tallinn. The company manufactured various products, including steam locomotives, equipment for power plants and the oil shale industry, and agricultural machinery. During the Soviet occupation the company was nationalized, and it became one of the largest contractors for the Soviet gas industry.

== History ==
The company was founded on 25 April 1865, when the German brazier Franz Joachim Heinrich Krull rented a coppersmith workshop from the city of Narva, which had belonged to the late Friedrich Ludwig Büll. The main product of the newly established company became distillation apparatuses. In 1870 it introduced a type of distillation apparatus which had higher efficiency and quality than other models of that time, and this equipment sold so well that Krull was able to buy the workshop outright.

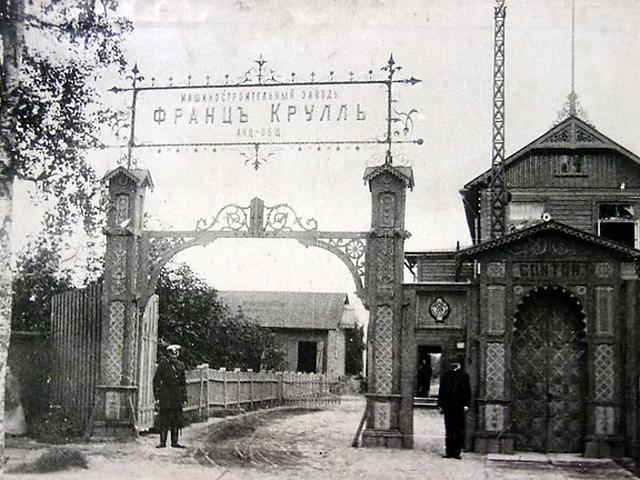
Entrance to the Franz Krull plant

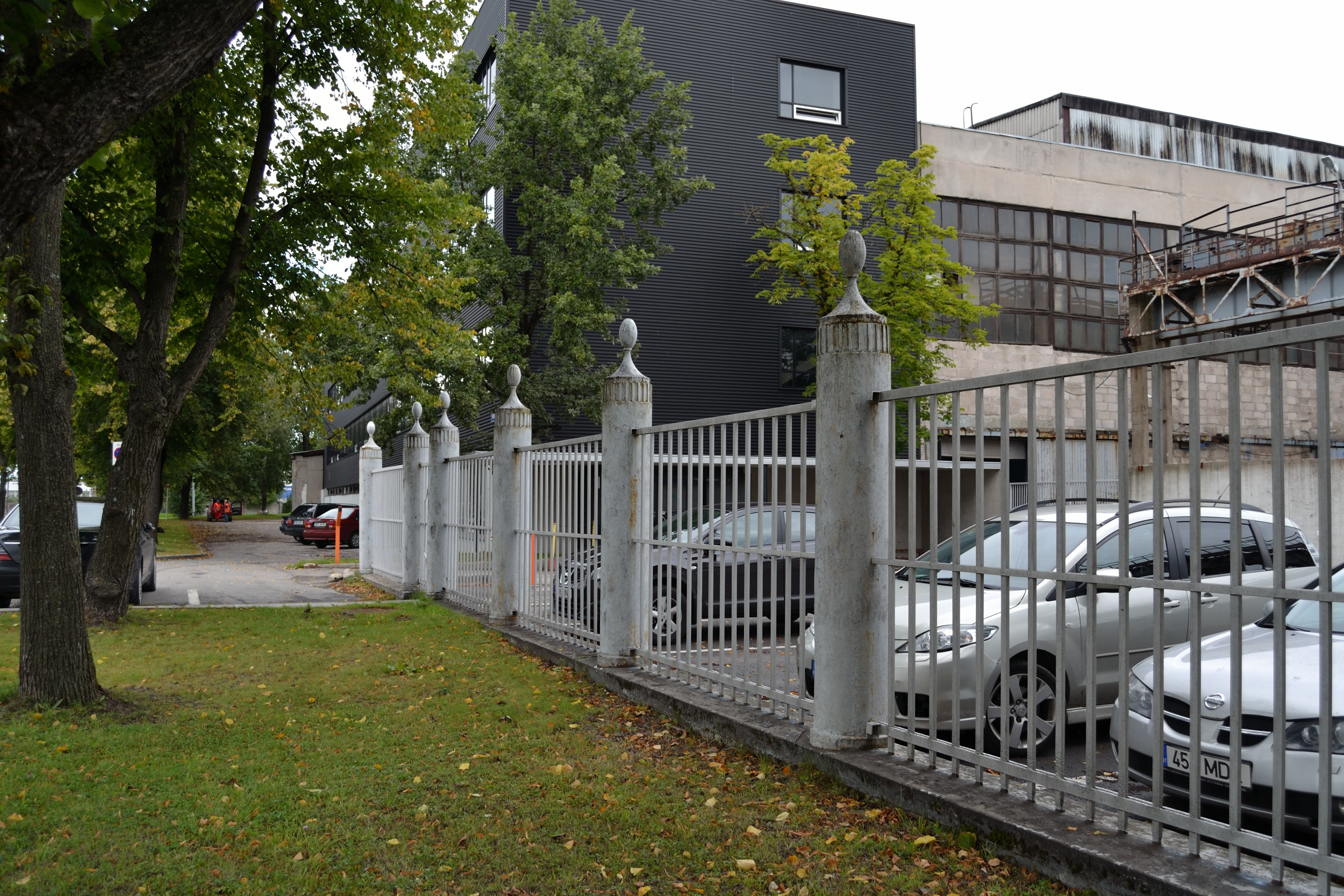
The cast-iron fence of the Franz Krull plant (1931)

In 1875, Franz Krull sold the workshop in Narva and moved the industry to Tallinn. In 1895, his sons Franz Krull II and Gerhard Krull took over the management of the company. In 1899, the industry moved to the Kalamaja district in Tallinn. The company also produced boilers, e.g. for the Tallinn Power Plant, and locomotives, cisterns and tanks, filters and pumps, transmissions and gears, equipment for lumber mills and copper smithies, and various cast iron products. Production of the distillery equipment decreased but continued to be a part of the production portfolio. Before World War I AS Franz Krull received a number of contracts from the Russian military sector, particularly from three shipyards in Tallinn which were established in 1912–1913. As a result, the company had 400 employees in 1913. The company also started to manufacture high-capacity refrigeration and ice-making equipment.

When World War I started, Gerhard Krull was in Germany and could not return to Estonia. As a German national, he was afraid the company would be confiscated. To avoid this, the ownership was transferred to his brother-in-law, who immediately sold the company to the Azov–Don Commercial Bank and fled with money. Franz Krull II continued as a director of the company until his death in 1917. During the war, the company manufactured water desalination systems for cruisers, cooling systems and boilers for cargo ships, and various machines and equipment for fortresses.

In the beginning of the independence of Estonia, AS Franz Krull was taken over by German financiers. Later it was listed at the Tallinn stock exchange. The company manufactured mainly cast iron consumer goods. In 1927, it started to manufacture equipment for the oil shale industry. Between 1927 and 1938, it manufactured four tunnel ovens for the oil shale company Eesti Kiviõli. In 1938, the Glen Davis Shale Oil Works in Australia planned to order two tunnel ovens from AS Franz Krull; however, due to time and budget constraints the deal was not finalized. In 1931, AS Franz Krull manufactured its first steam locomotive. The company continued to manufacture refrigeration equipment, which in addition to the Estonian market was exported to Lithuania, and occasionally also to India, Iran, the United Kingdom, Yugoslavia, Romania, and Bulgaria. The company produced also road construction machinery, peat industry machinery, agricultural machinery, and boilers.

After the start of the Soviet occupation, the company was nationalized and renamed Punane Krull (meaning Red Krull). After the start of World War II, equipment and employees were transferred to Russia to avoid capture by German forces. During the German occupation the metal works continued in Tallinn under German administration.

After restoration of Soviet rule in Estonia, the company was renamed Plant No. 9 of the Main Department of Synthetic Liquid Fuel and Gas (Russian: Завод № 9 Главгазтоппром) in 1945. The plant specialized in the production of equipment for the oil shale and natural gas industry, as well as lifting equipment. In 1949, it was renamed Tallinn Machinery Plant (Estonian: Tallinna Masinatehas). The plant production included large-scale ventilators, centrifugal pumps, high-power steam boilers, conveyors, and elevators. Its drilling rigs were used in the Soviet Union, as well as in Albania, Romania, China and several Arab countries.

In 1955, the plant was placed under the USSR Oil and Gas Industry Construction Ministry, which focused on the manufacture of construction machinery. In 1963, the plant started manufacturing air-cooled heat exchangers. In 1971, the plant was renamed after the communist politician Johannes Lauristin.

After Estonia regained independence, the plant was privatized in 1993. As of 2018, it is named OÜ Tallinna Masinatehas, and its main product is heat exchangers.

== Bibliography ==
- Holmberg, Rurik (2008). Survival of the Unfit. Path Dependence and the Estonian Oil Shale Industry (PDF). Linköping Studies in Arts and Science. Vol. 427. Linköping University.
