= Kalamaja =

Subdistrict of Tallinn, Estonia

Coordinates: 59.446981°N 24.730981°E

- Subdistrict of Tallinn
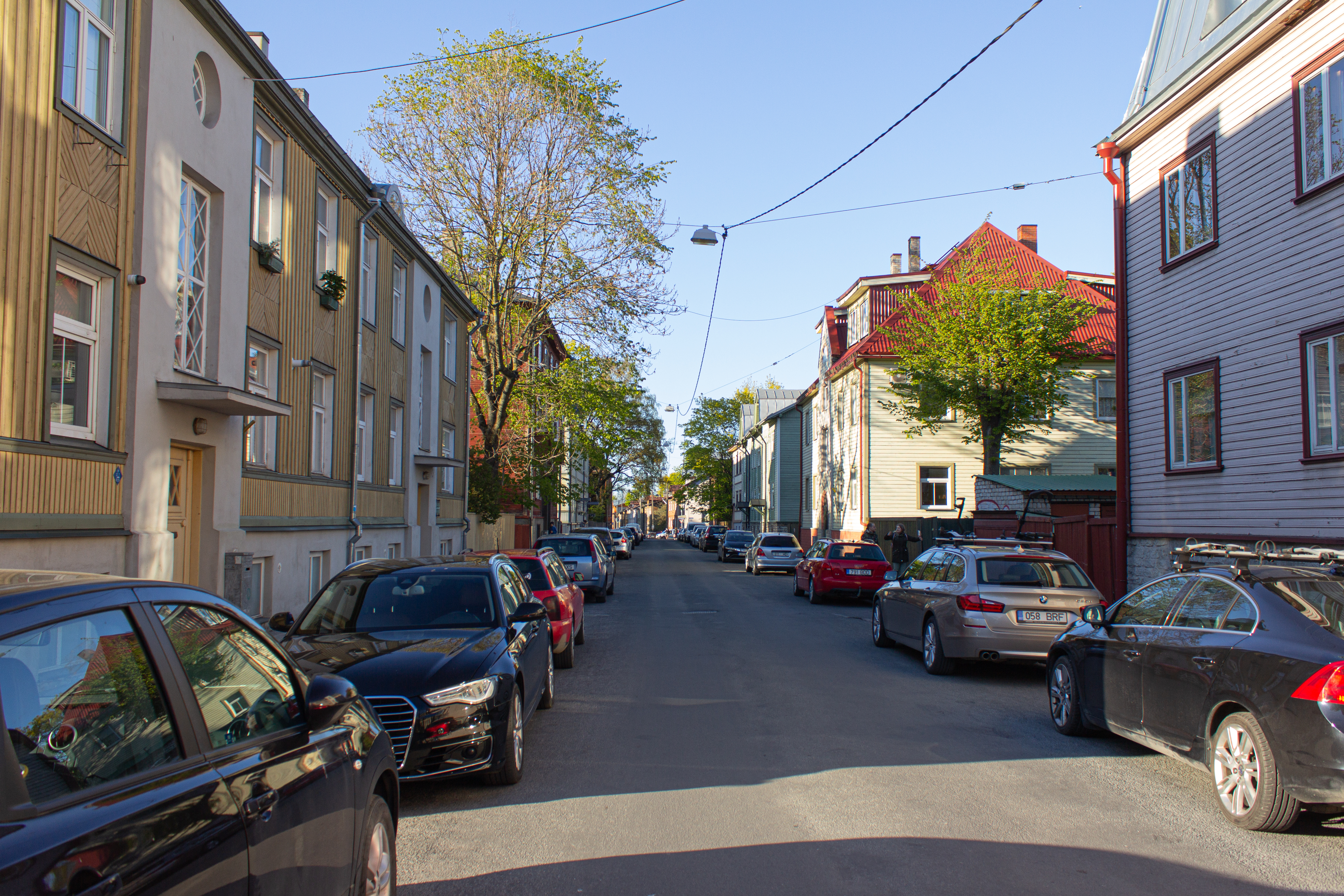
- Typical wooden apartment buildings in Kalamaja.

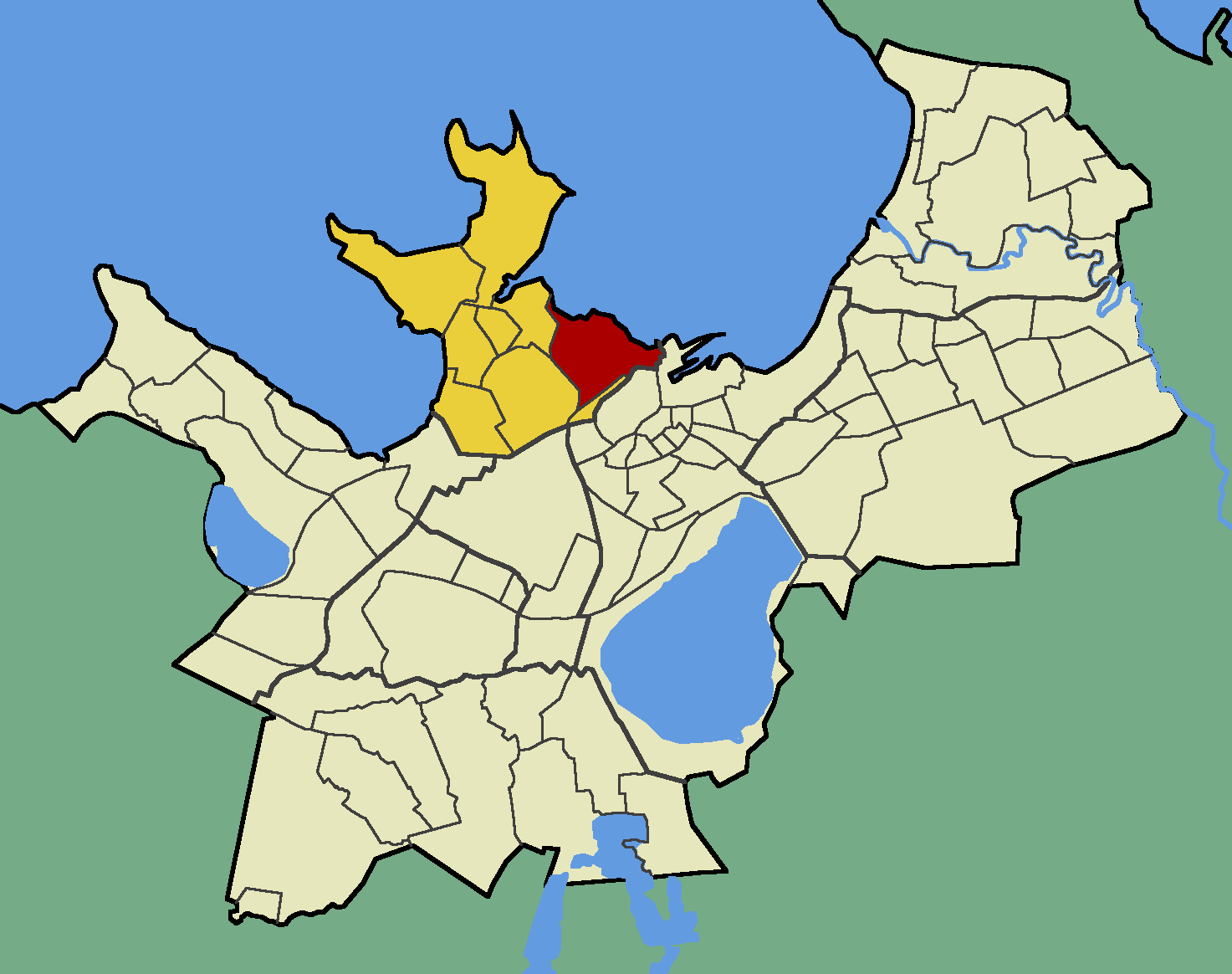
- Kalamaja within Põhja-Tallinn.
- Country: Estonia
- County: Harju County
- City: Tallinn
- District: Põhja-Tallinn

Population (2022)
  - Total: 12,930

Kalamaja (Estonian for Fish House; German: Fischermay) is a subdistrict of the district of Põhja-Tallinn (Northern Tallinn) in Tallinn, the capital of Estonia. It is located just northwest of the historical town centre, on the coast of the Tallinn Bay. Kalamaja has a population of 12,930 (As of 1 August 2022).

Kalamaja is a preserved wooden architecture areas in Tallinn and Estonia. The neighbourhood has been known for its colourful hodgepodge of old fashioned, working class houses.

Throughout most of Tallinn's history Kalamaja served as the city's main fishing harbour. Starting from the 14th century the area was traditionally dominated by fishermen, fishmongers and boat wrights. A new era began in 1870, when Tallinn was connected to Saint Petersburg by railroad. The Tallinn railway station (Balti jaam), was built between Kalamaja and the city centre. Suddenly enormous factories started to sprout up in this part of town, and they brought with them an influx of thousands of new workers. The wooden houses, which have become Kalamaja's architectural legacy, were built to accommodate these workers.

Most of the Kalamaja's main sightseeings are located on the coast of Kalamaja. In 2011 a former railway embankment was converted into a walking trail called "Culture Kilometre" (Kultuurikilomeeter). The walk-way starts next to the Tallinn harbour passes the Creative Hub (Kultuurikatel), continues past the historic Patarei Prison and Sea Fortress, the region's biggest sea centre Seaplane Harbour (Lennusadam) and ends at the end of Kalamaja park on Tööstuse street. In 2015, the former Kultuurikilomeeter was converted into a street, which quickly became one of the defining streets of the neighbourhood.

== Kalamaja Cemetery ==
Kalamaja was the location of the oldest cemetery in Tallinn, known as Kalamaja Cemetery (Estonian: Kalamaja kalmistu, German: Fischermay Kirchhof) which was founded in the 15th or 16th century. The cemetery was flattened in 1964, during the second occupation of the Baltic states, by Soviet authorities who used the Kalamaja area as a base for the Soviet Armed Forces.

== Gallery ==
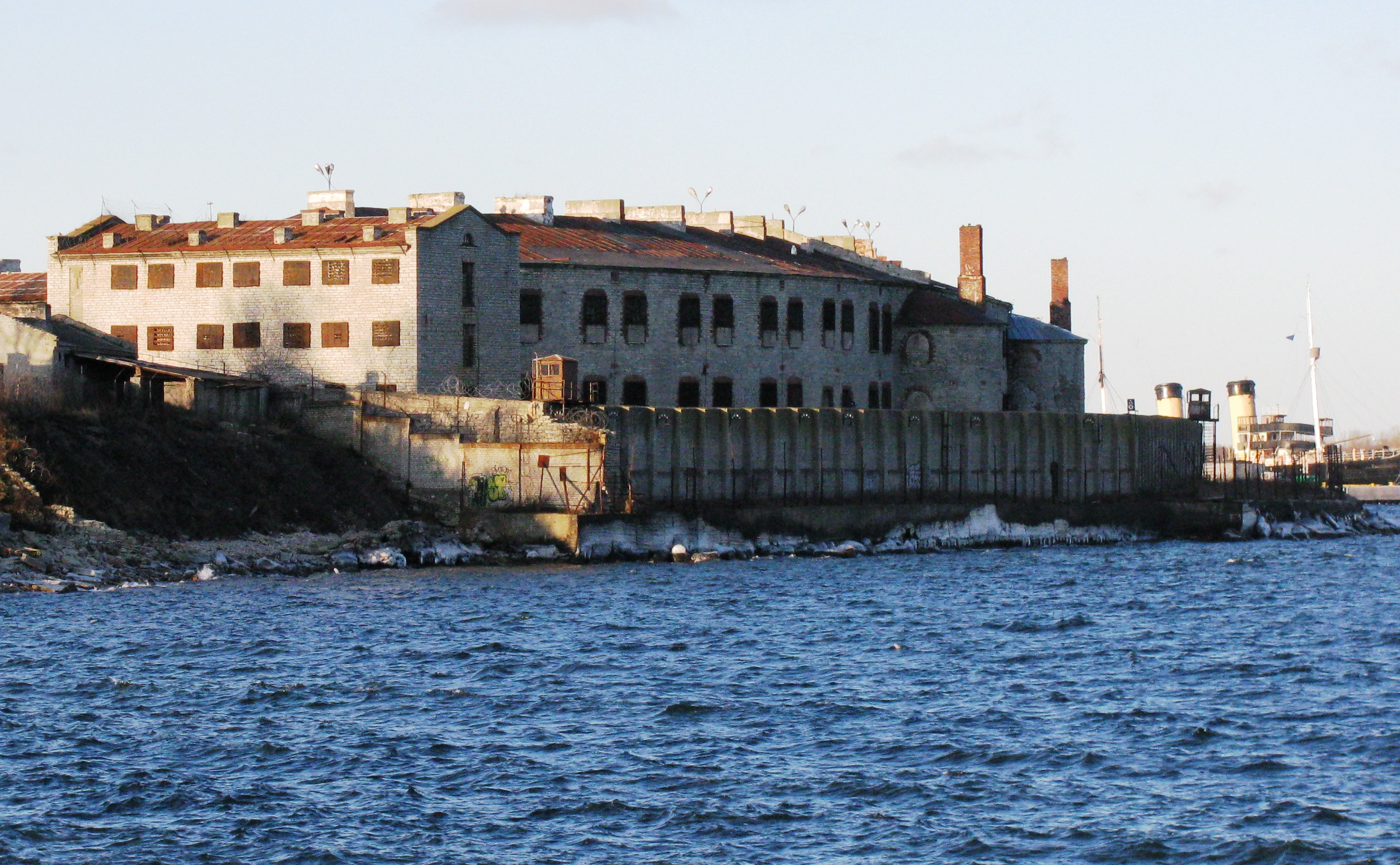
Former Patarei Prison

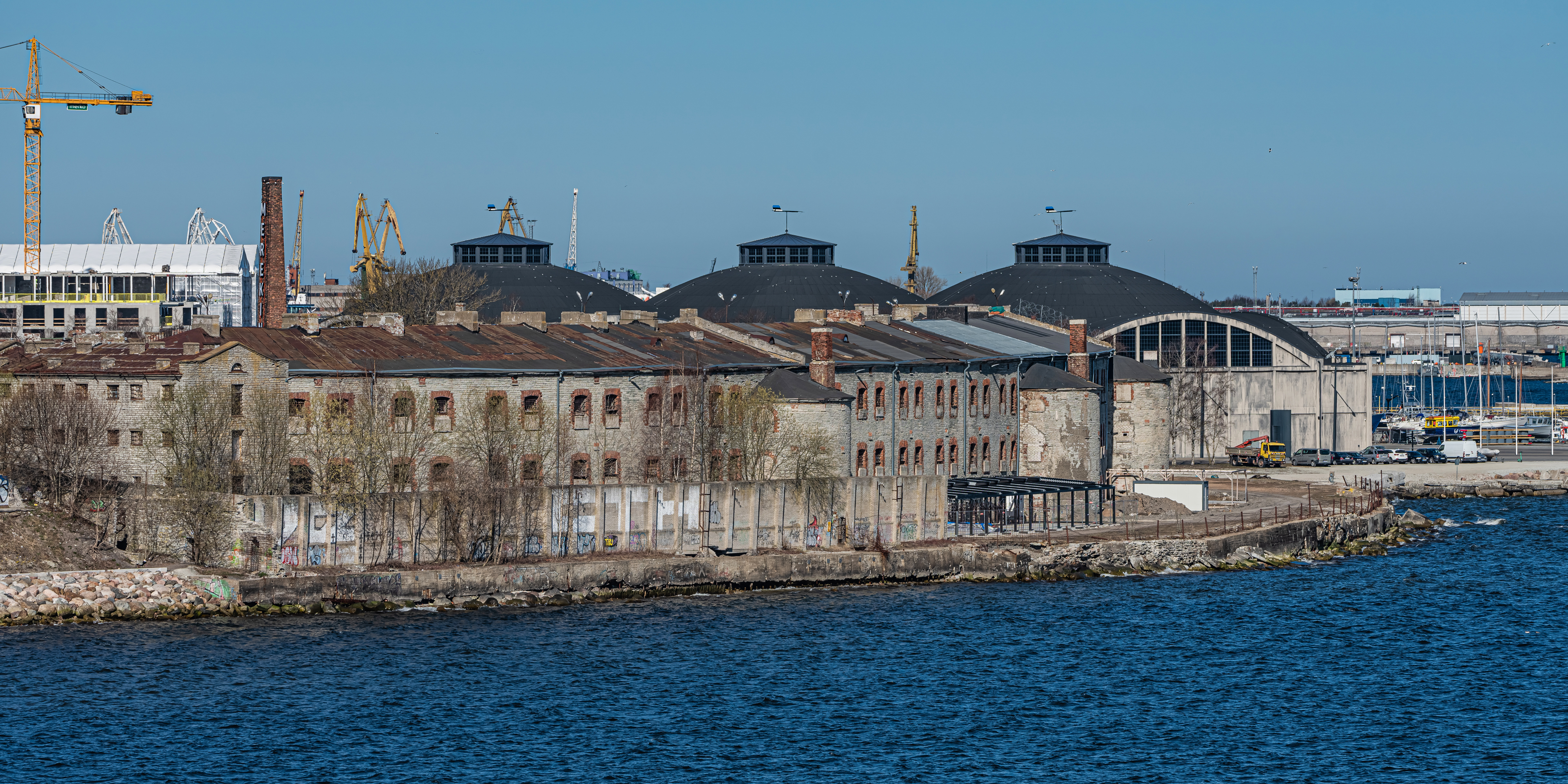
Seaplane hangars from 1916–1917, part of Peter the Great's Naval Fortress, now housing the Estonian Maritime Museum

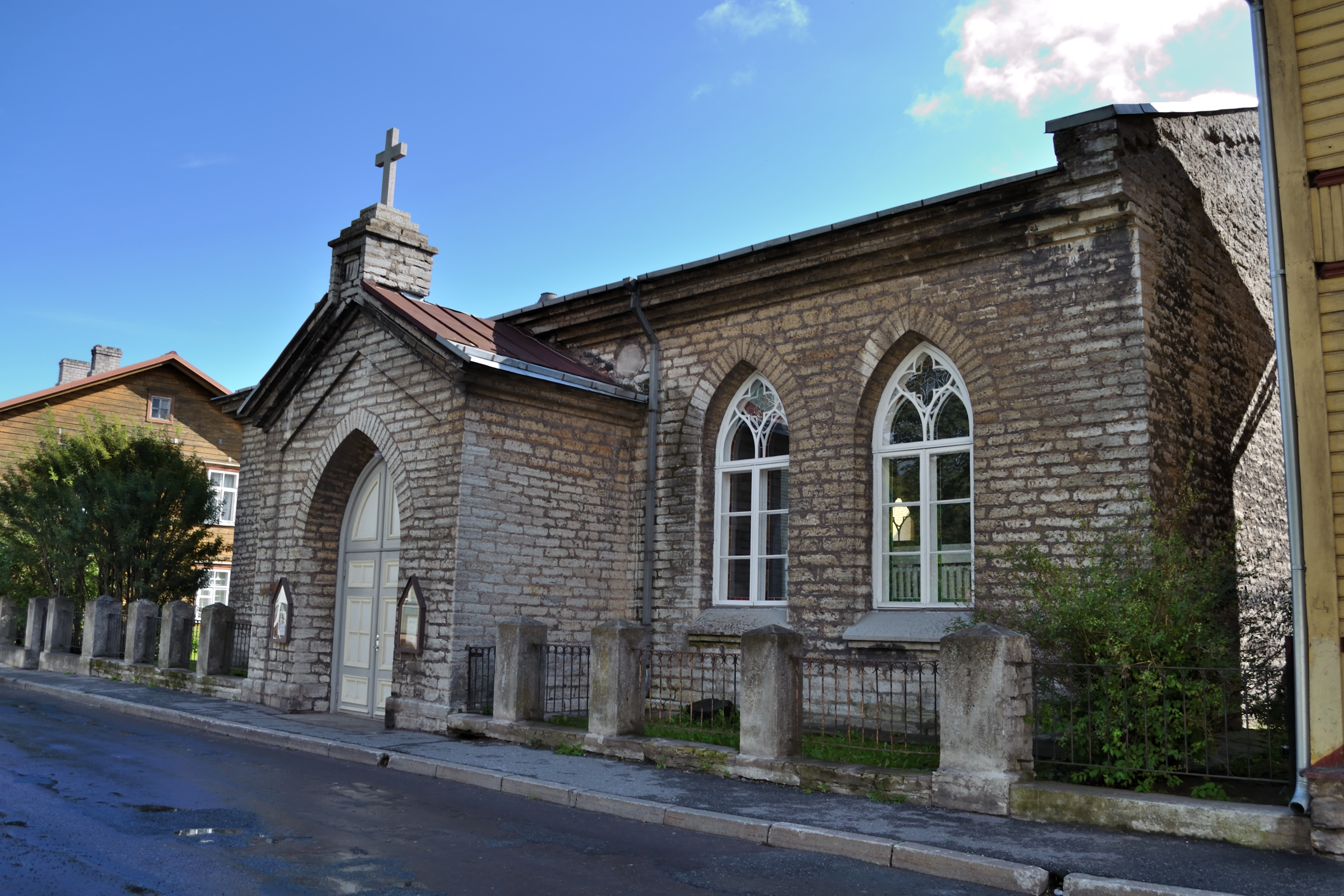
The baptist prayer-house on Kalju Street

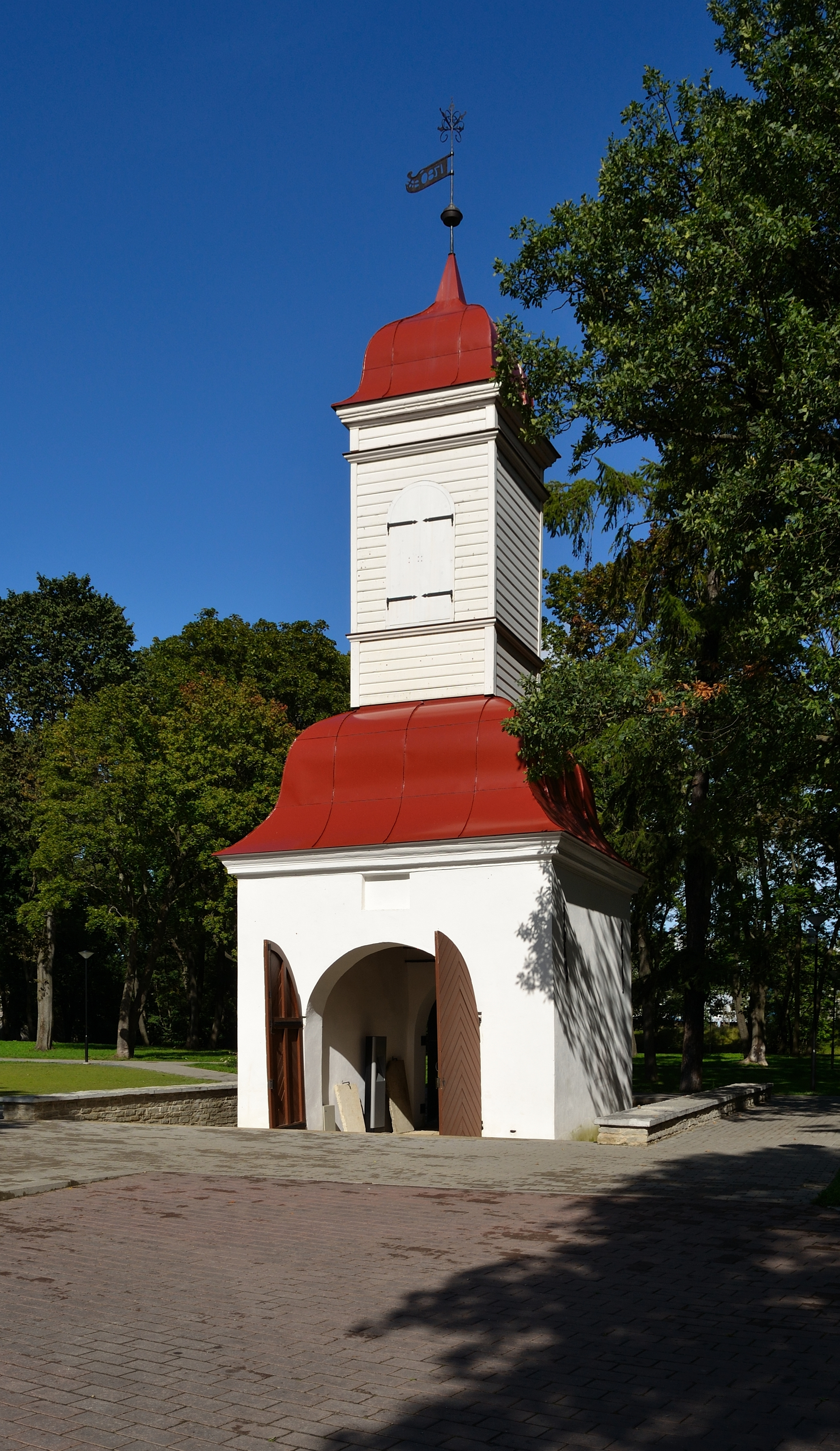
A gate-belltower at Kalamaja Cemetery

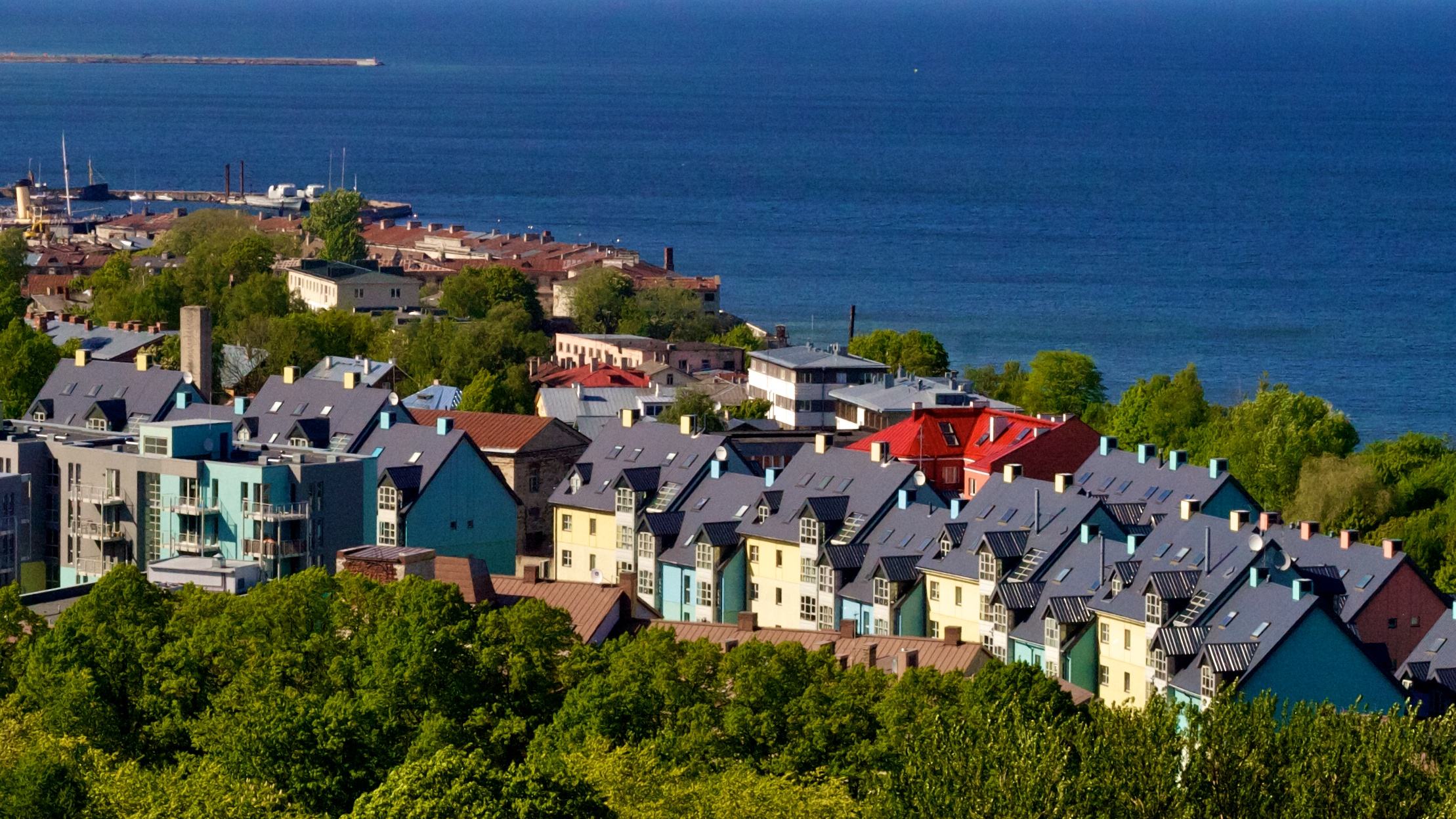
Newer apartment buildings in the Ilmarise quarter near the old town

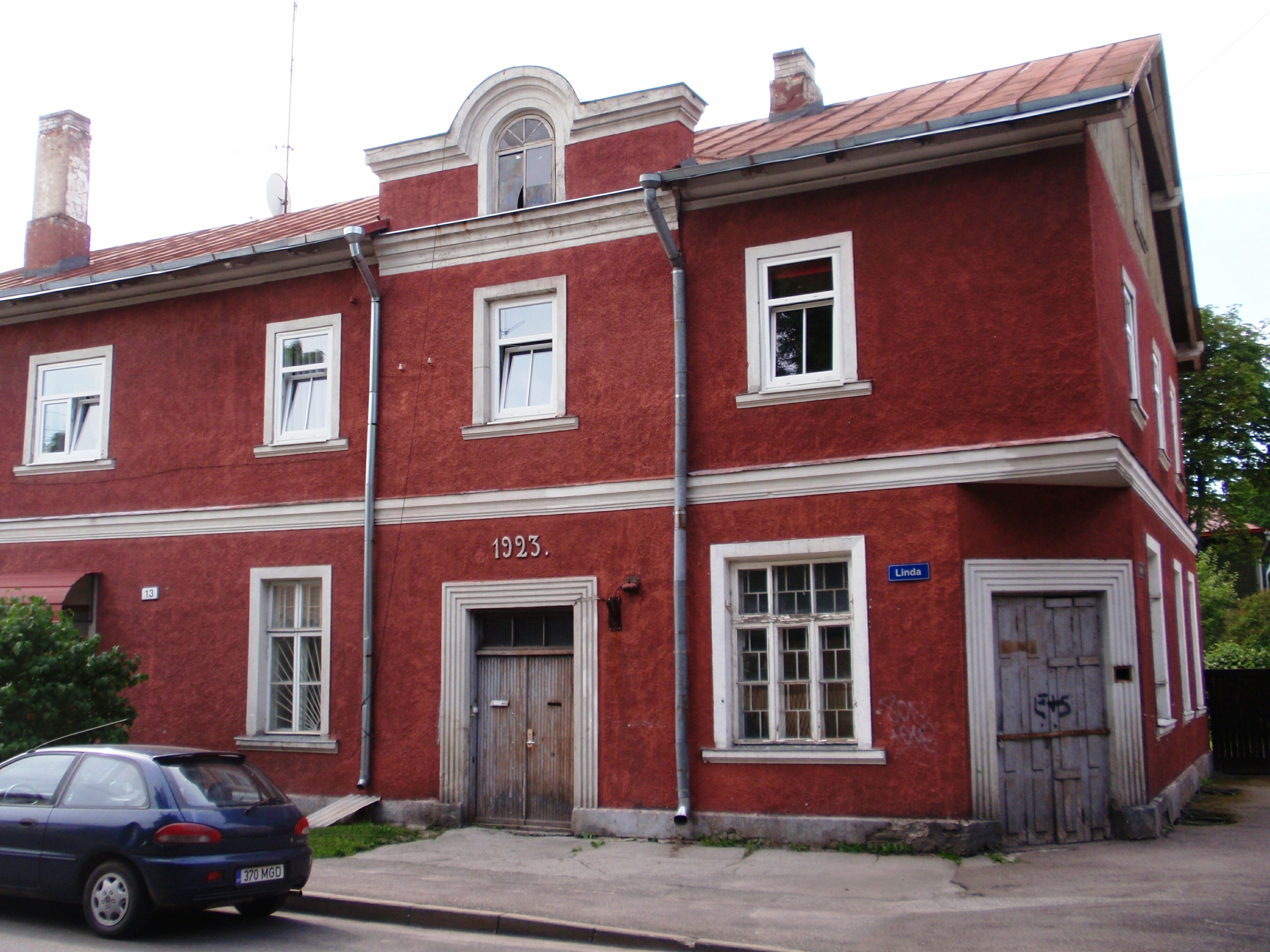

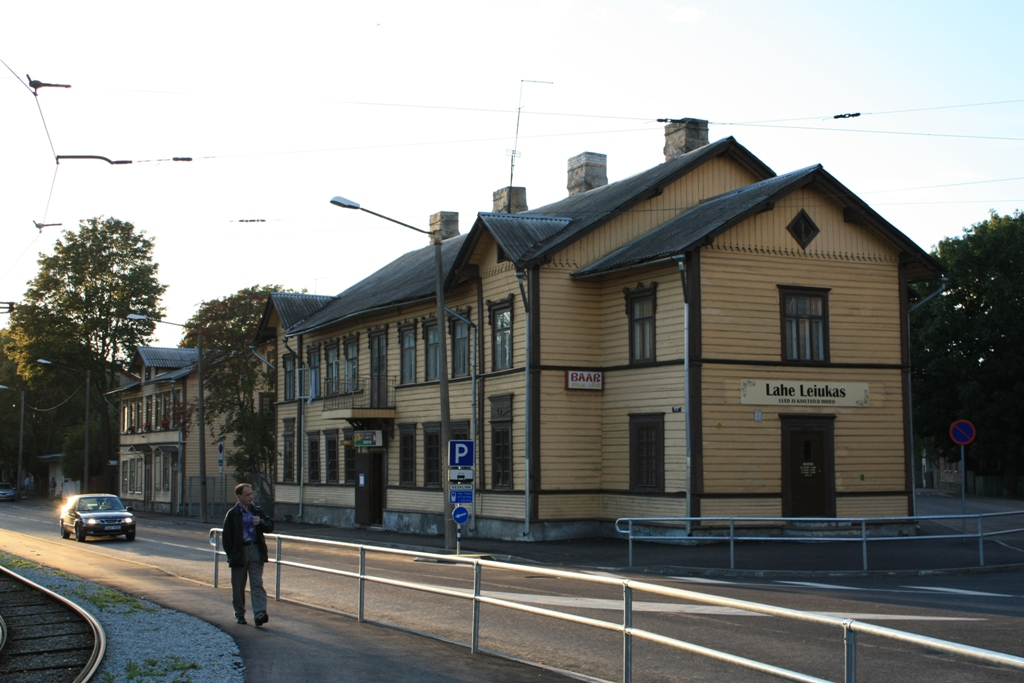

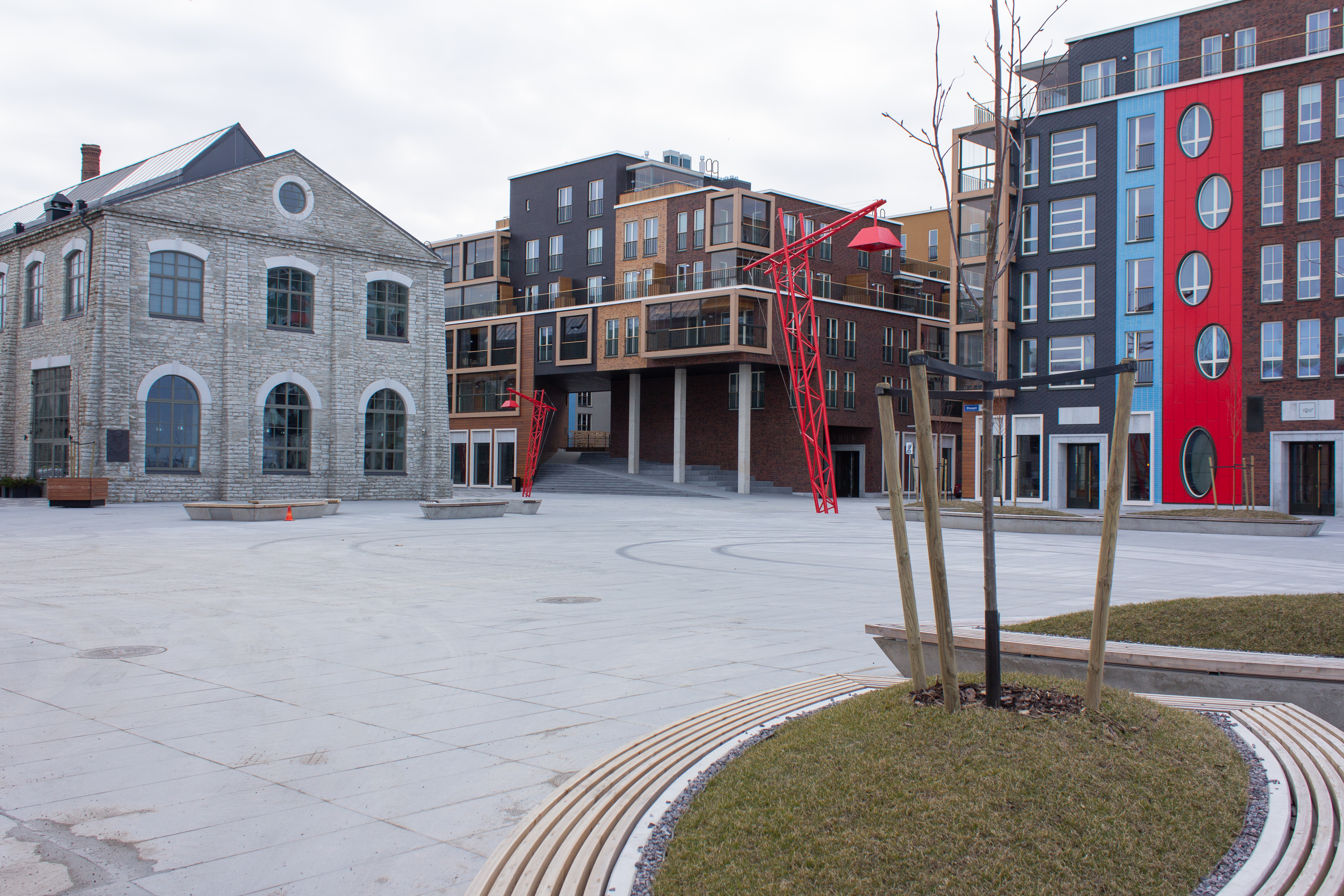
Adam Johann von Krusenstern Square

== See also ==
- Kalamaja cemetery
- Patarei Prison
- Linnahall
- Tallinn Power Plant (Kultuurikatel)
- Estonia Piano Factory
