= Franz Krull Sk class =

Locomotive class manufactured in Estonia

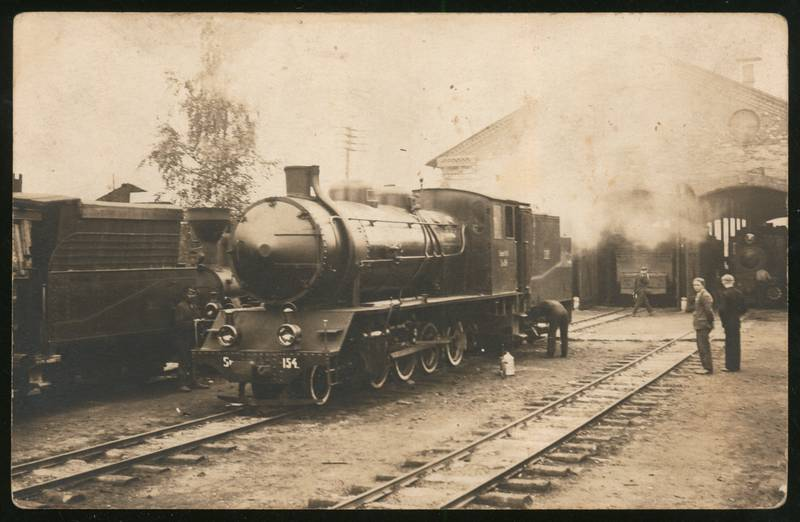
- Sk-154
Type and origin
- Power type: Steam
- Designer: A. Borsig works, Berlin, Germany
- Builder: AS Franz Krull, Tallinn, Estonia
- Build date: 1931-1940
- Total produced: 16
Specifications
- Configuration
  - Whyte: 2-8-0
  - UIC: 1′D h2
- Gauge: 750 mm (2 ft 5 1/2 in) narrow gauge
- Driver dia.: 900 mm (2 ft 11 3/8 in)
- Fuel type: Oil shale
- Fuel capacity: 8 tons
- Water cap.: 6 tons
- Boiler pressure: 13 atm (1.32 MPa; 191 psi)
- Cylinders: Two
- Cylinder size: 380 mm × 450 mm (14 15/16 in × 17 11/16 in)
Career
- Operators: Estonian Railways
- Disposition: All scrapped, none preserved

The Franz Krull Sk-class is a class of steam locomotive built by the Franz Krull metal works of Tallinn, Estonia between 1931-1940.

The Sk were narrow-gauged and used oil shale as fuel, since it is the primary energy source in Estonia. A total of 16 units were produced, of which none has survived. The last Sk, Sk-156, was scrapped in 1980 in Beloretsk, Russia, where it was actively used until scrapping.

== List of Sk locomotives ==
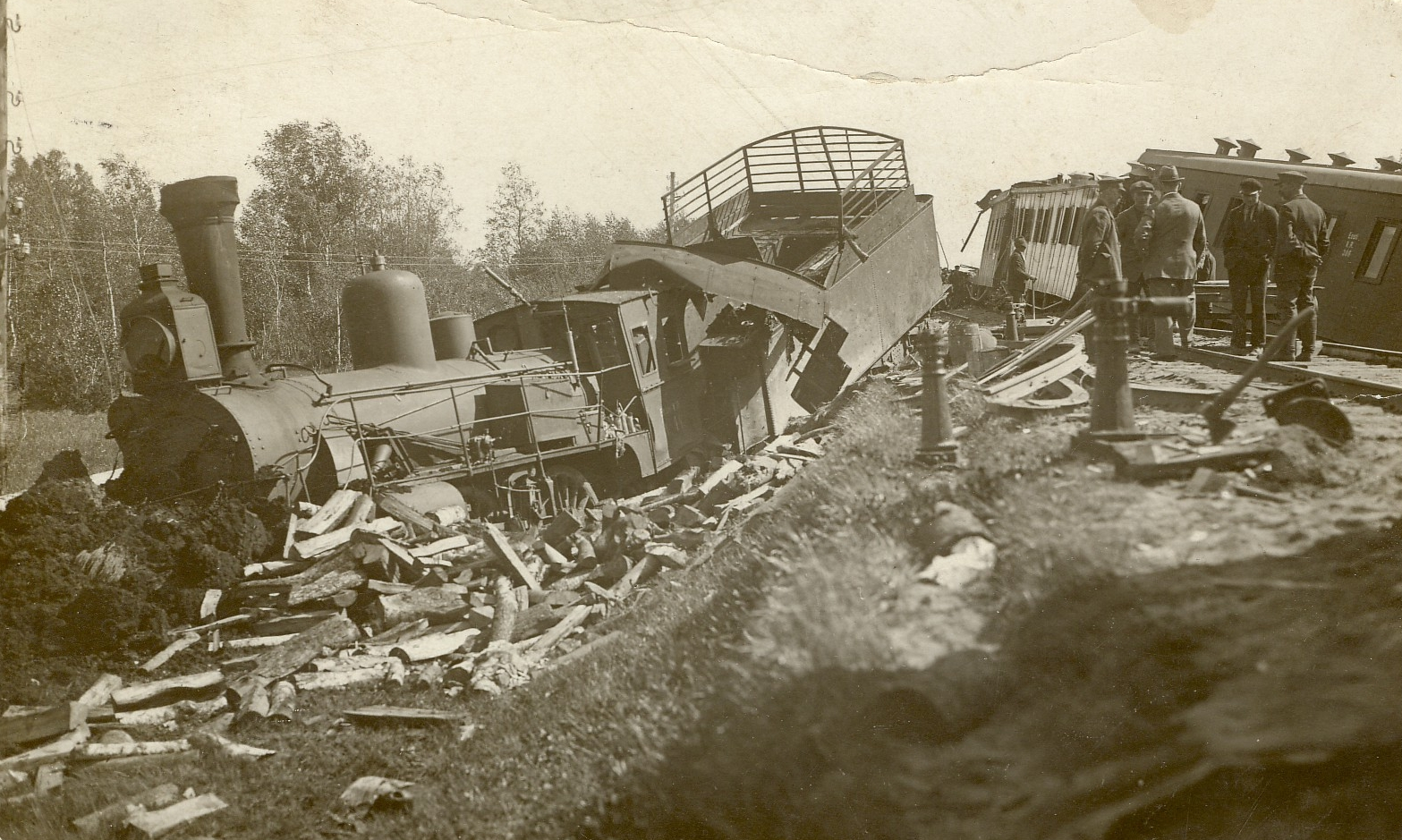
Sk-155 after the railway accident between stations Võhma and Olustvere.

Built in 1931:

- Sk-151
- Sk-152
- Sk-153
- Sk-154
- Sk-155
- Sk-156
- Sk-157
- Sk-158
- Sk-159
- Sk-150

Built in 1935:

- Sk-160
- Sk-161
- Sk-162

Built in 1940:

(During the first Soviet occupation of Estonia, when the factory was renamed "Punane Krull" ("Red Krull"). These locomobiles were decorated by the red star and hammer and stickle figures.)

- Sk-163
- Sk-164
- Sk-165
