= Volta (Estonian company) =

Factory based in Tallinn, Estonia

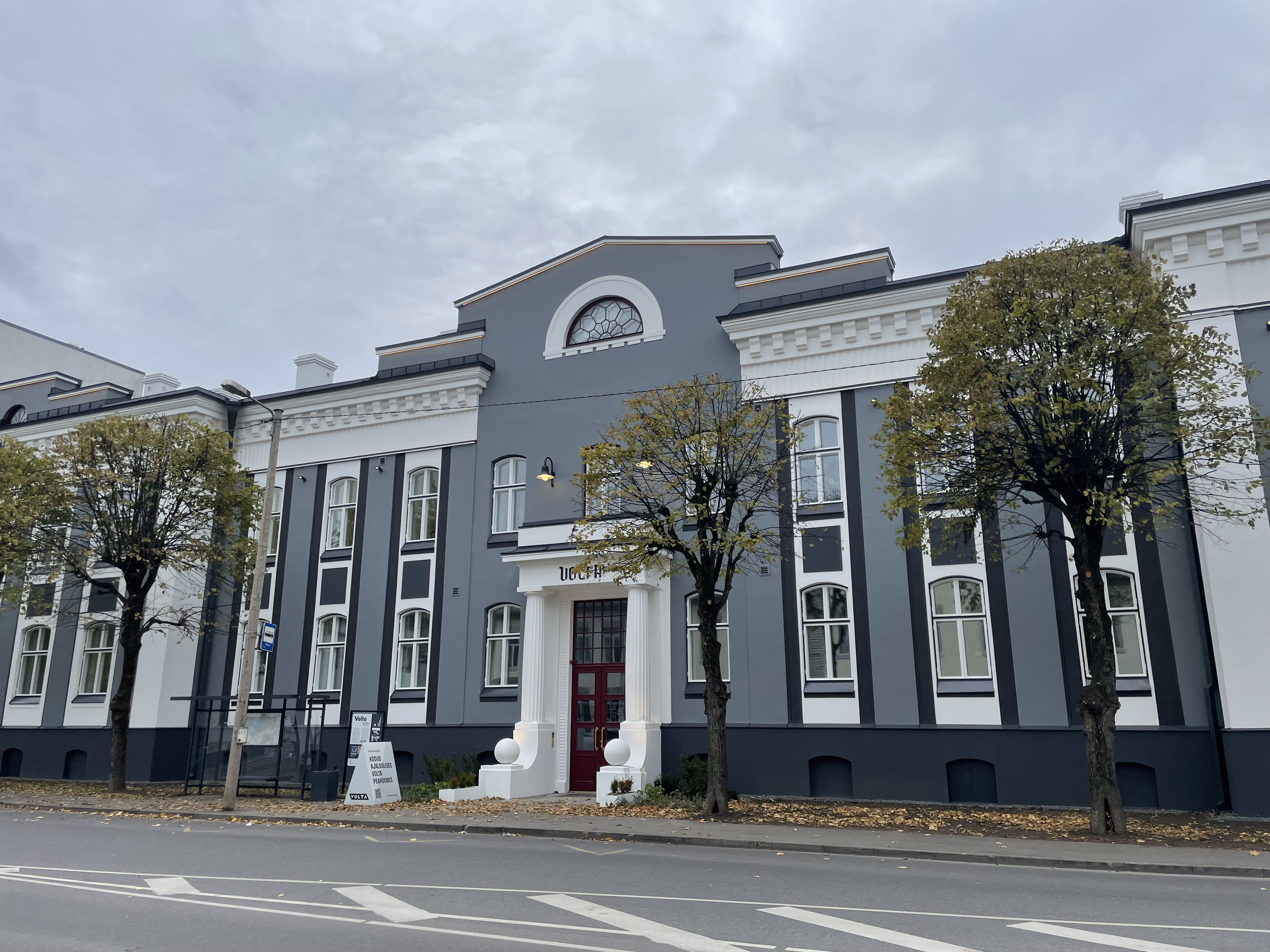
Renovated administration building of Volta factory

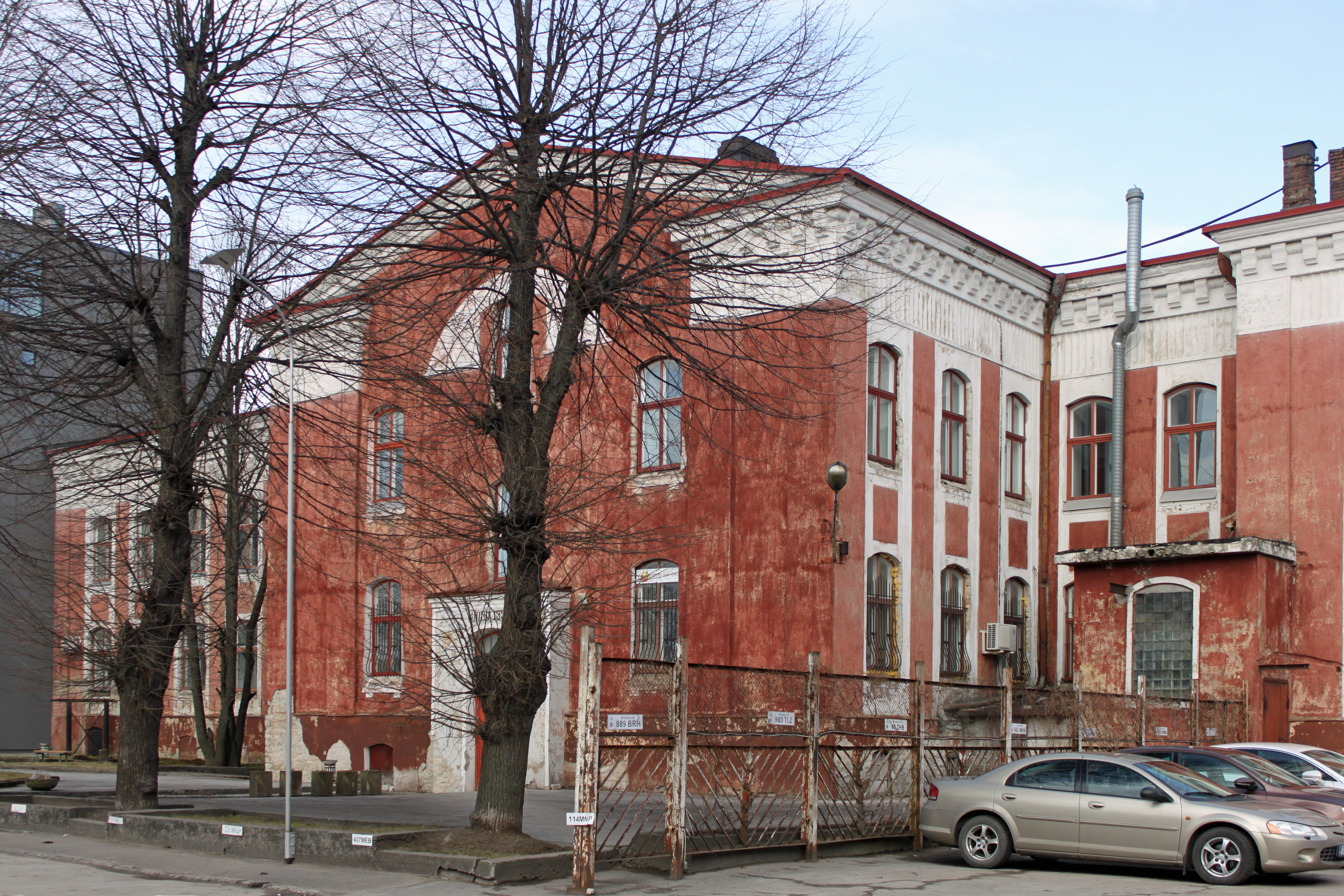
Old Administrative building of Volta (before 2024)

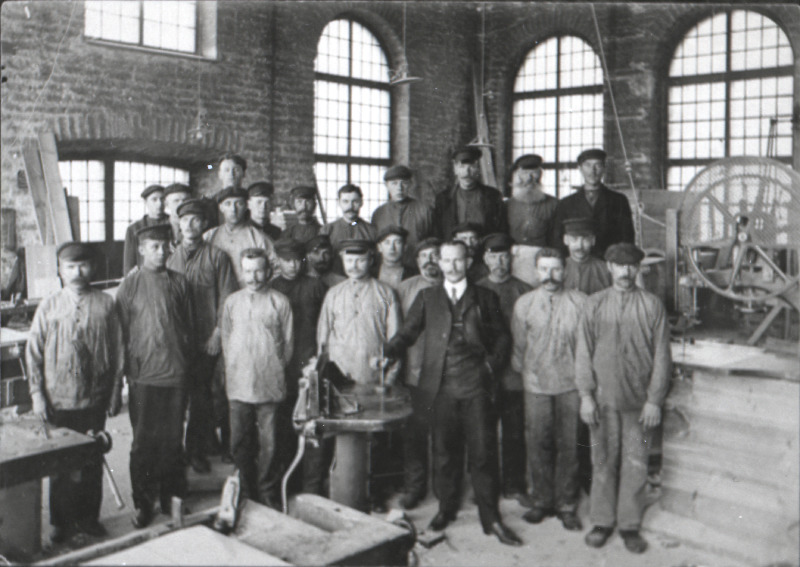
Workers of Volta in 1903

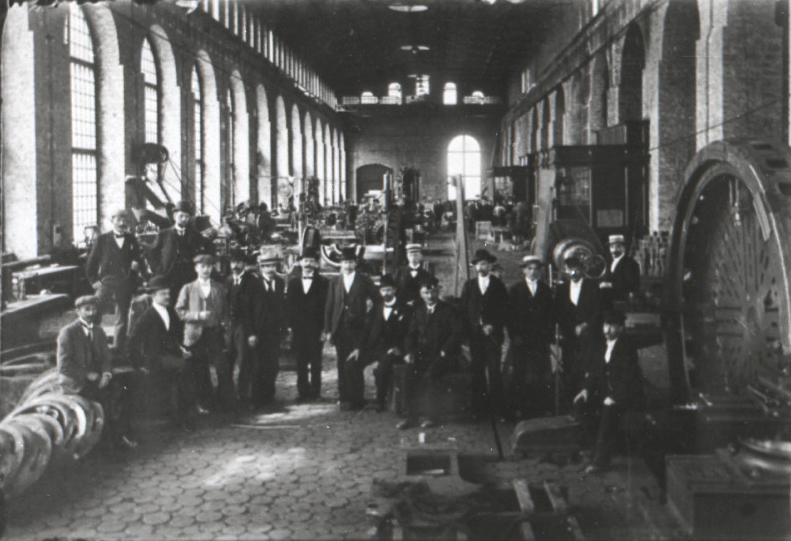
View to the Volta manufacturing unit in 1903

Volta was a manufacturing company (factory) based in Tallinn, Estonia.

Volta was established on 15 April 1899 (went into business on 5 January 1900) by Carl and Christian Luther. Volta produced electric motors and generators. In 1909, Volta produced turbines and generators for Tallinn Power Plant.

In 1916, Volta has 860 workers and its turnover was about 5.5 million roubles. In 1917, the factory was evacuated to Russia. Factory's buildings stayed empty almost five years. In 1920s, Volta was re-established by Republic of Estonia. In 1939, Volta has 244 workers. In 1940, Volta was nationalized.

In 1963, 242,000 electric motors, 70,000 small motors, 190,000 electric irons, 2,000 wafer makers and 6,700 radiators were produced in Volta.

1994–1996, Volta was liquidated.
