= Tallinn Power Plant =

Former power plant in Tallinn, Estonia

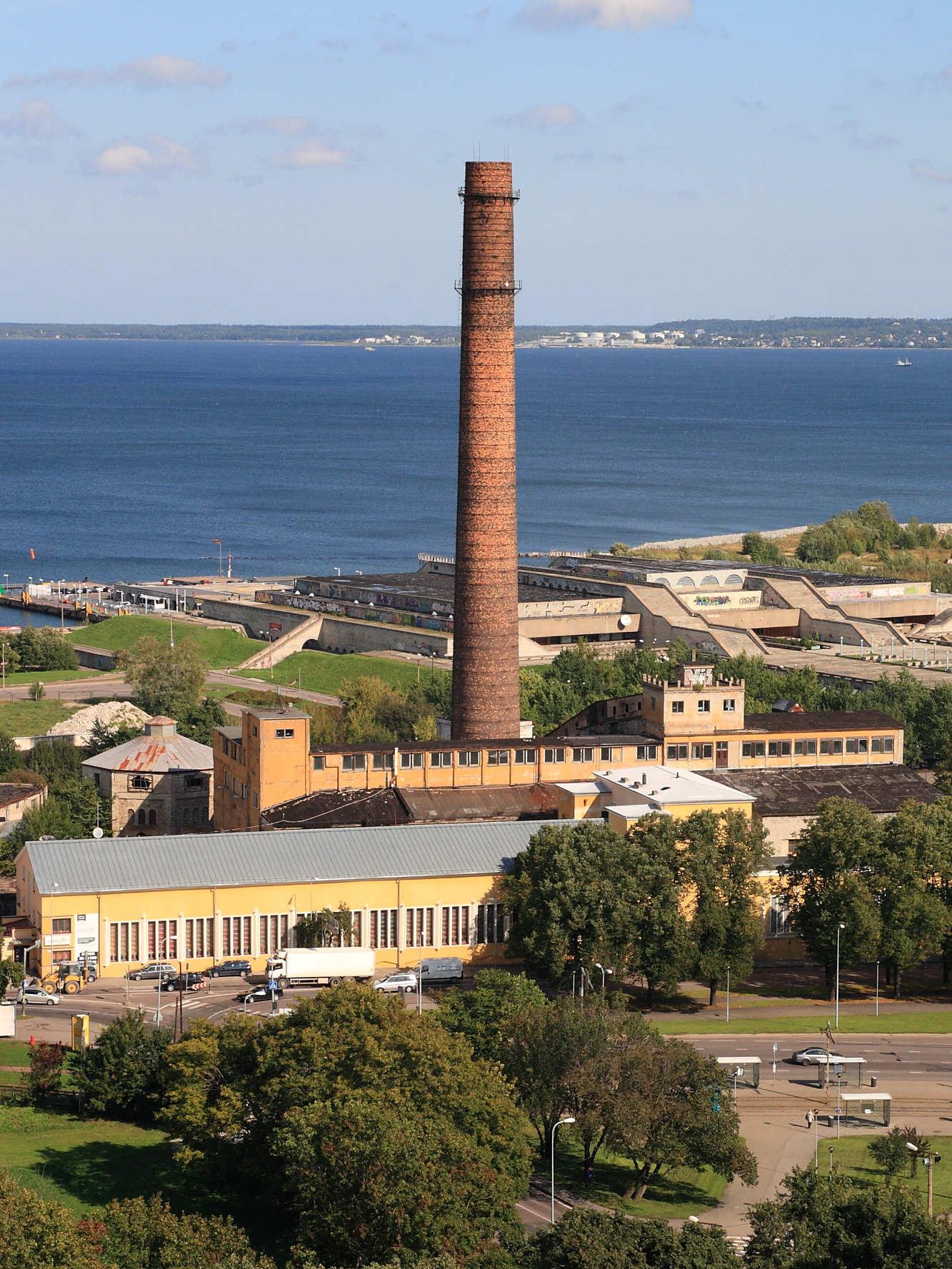
- Boiler house and chimney of the former Tallinn Power Plant
- Official name: Tallinna Elektrijaam
- Country: Estonia
- Location: Tallinn
- Coordinates: 59°26′40″N 24°45′2″E
- Status: Decommissioned
- Construction began: 1912
- Commission date: 24 March 1913
- Decommission date: 2 February 1979

Thermal power station
- Primary fuel: Coal
- Secondary fuel: Oil shale
- Tertiary fuel: Peat
- Cogeneration?: Yes

External links
- Commons: Related media on Commons

The Tallinn Power Plant (Estonian: Tallinna elektrijaam) is a former power plant located in Tallinn, Estonia. Construction of the power plant was initiated by Volta company and it was decided by the Tallinn City Council in 1912 after the work of special committee established in 1909. The plant was located next to the Tallinn Gas Factory at the location of the former Stuart fortress. The plant was designed by Volta and the architect was Hans Schmidt. Originally it used three Laval-type 250 horsepower (0.19 MW) steam turbines and three 250 horsepower (0.19 MW) electric generators—all produced by Volta. Two coal-fired boilers were manufactured by AS Franz Krull. The power plant was opened on 24 March 1913, and originally it was fired by coal. In 1919–1920 the plant was expanded and transferred to peat and wood. In 1924 the power plant was switched to oil shale. It was the first power plant in the world to employ oil shale as its primary fuel. In 1939, the plant achieved capacity of 22 MW.

In 1929, a new turbine hall and in 1932 a new switchboard were commissioned. In 1941, the power plant was destroyed by leaving Soviet troops but was restored by 1948. A new 102.5-metre (336 ft) flue-gas stack was built. On 9 October 1959, the plant started to operate as combined heat and power plant providing district heating to Tallinn. In 1965, the plant was switched to fuel oil. The plant ceased electricity production on 2 February 1979.

In 1978, the power plant area was used for the Andrei Tarkovsky's film Stalker as the threshold to the Zone. The UN's acronym, which is still visible, was painted on the power plant's flue-gas stack.

Since 1984, the former power plant boiler house is used as an energy museum. Since 2011, the power plant complex is used for hosting the Tallinn Creative Hub (Kultuurikatel).

== Gallery ==
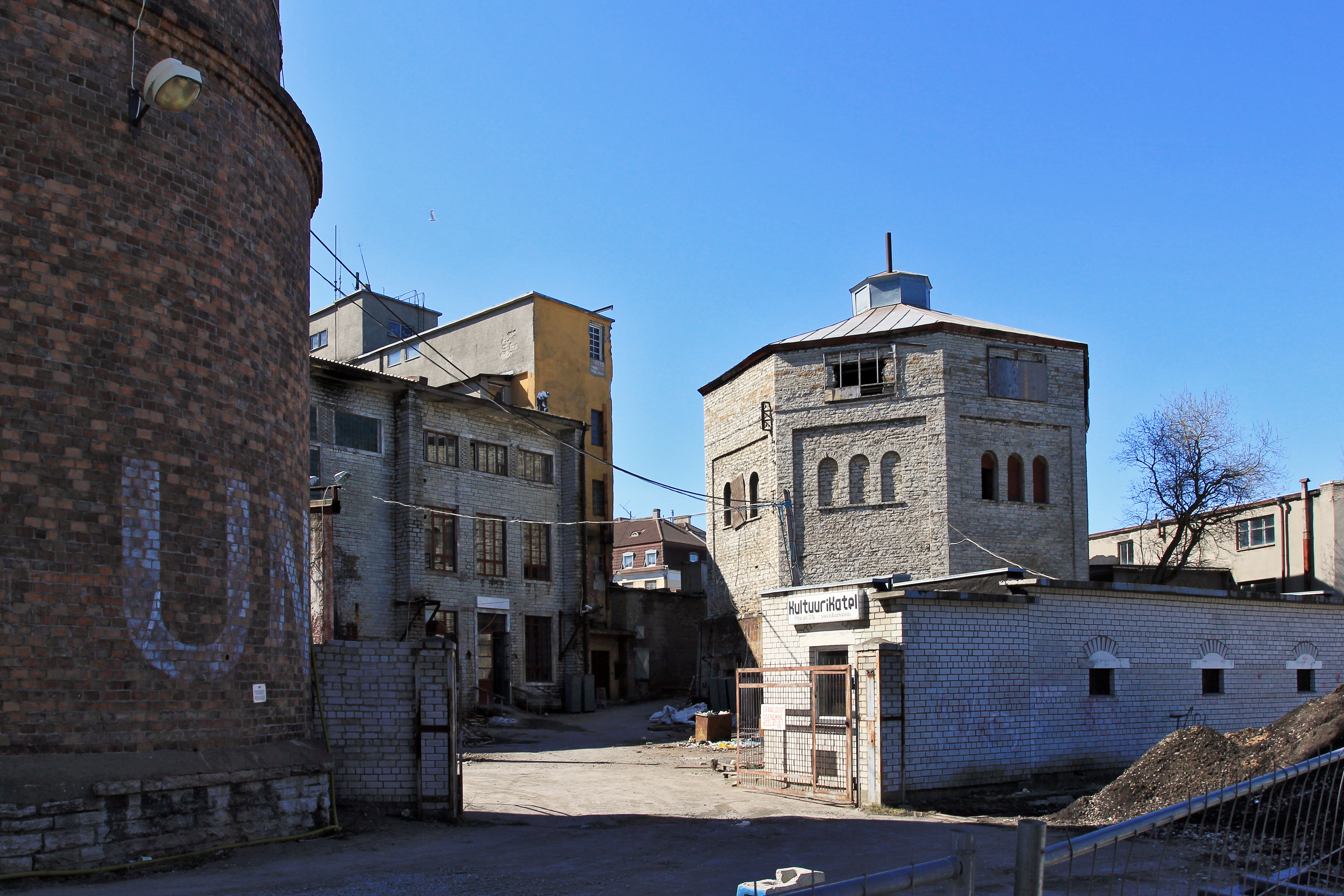
Gasometer

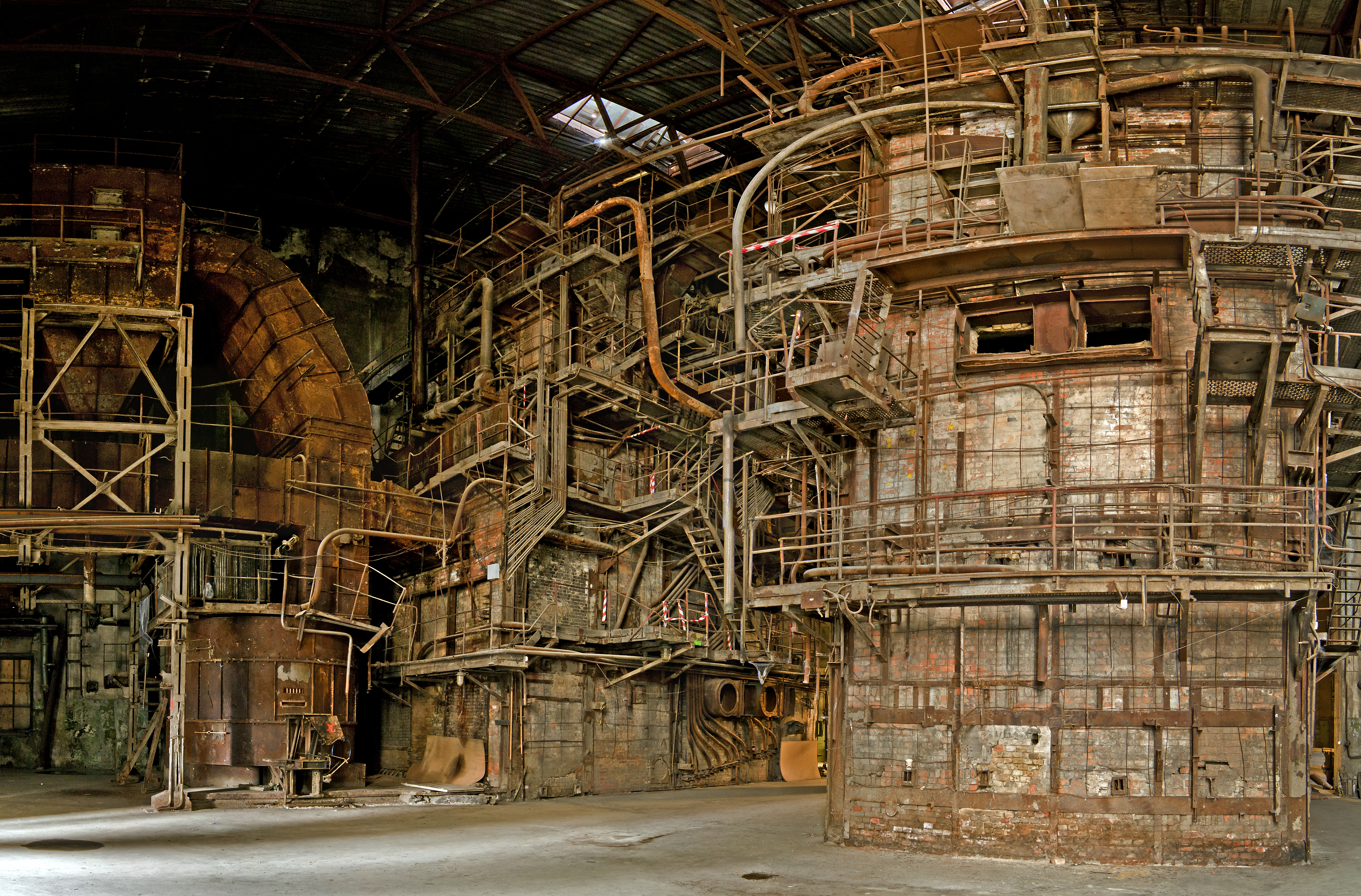
Inside view of the boilerroom.

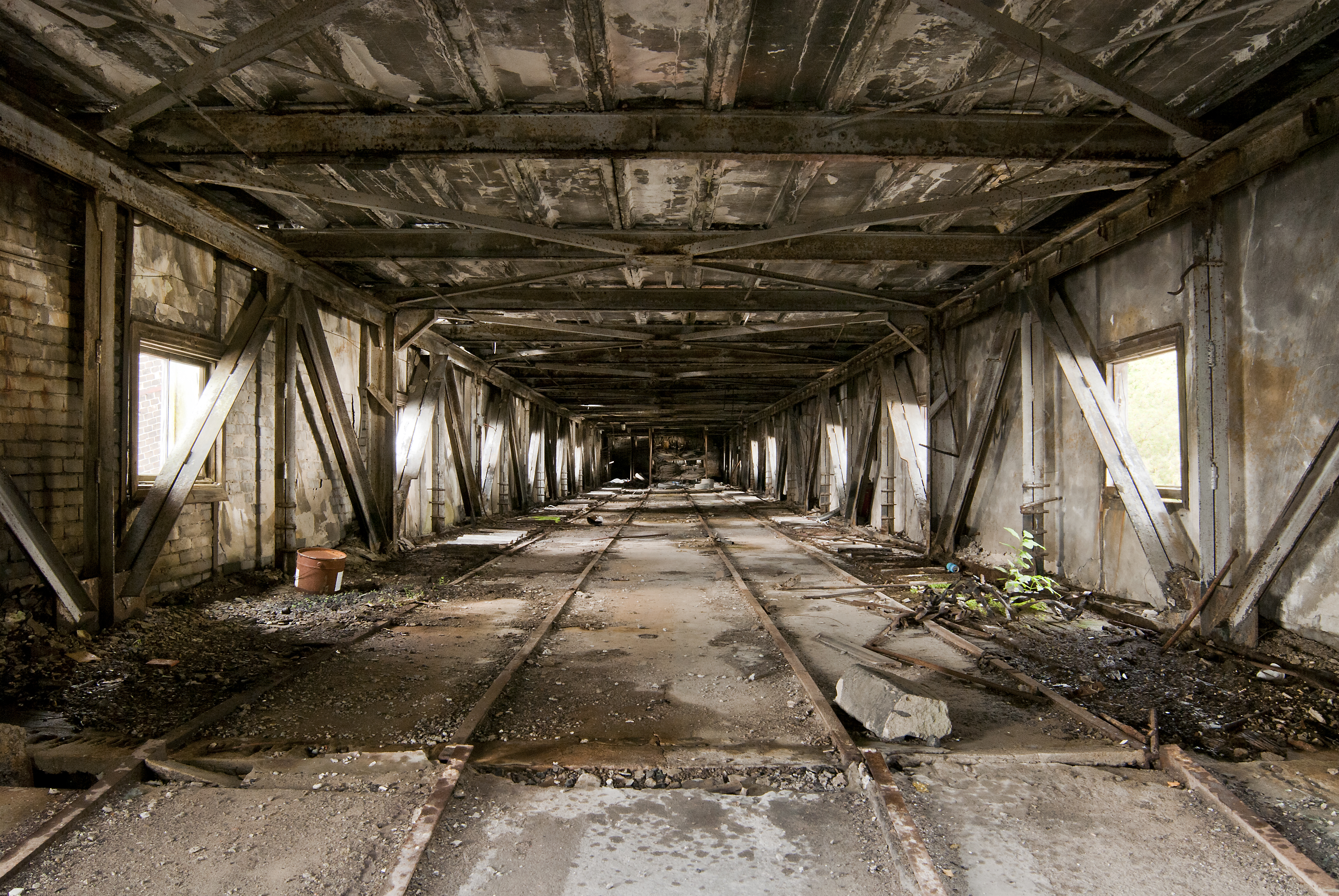
Estacade

== See also ==
- Energy in Estonia
