= Kultuurikatel =

Cultural organisation in Tallinn, Estonia, situated in the Tallinn Power Plant

Coordinates: 59°26′39.48″N 24°45′2.73″E

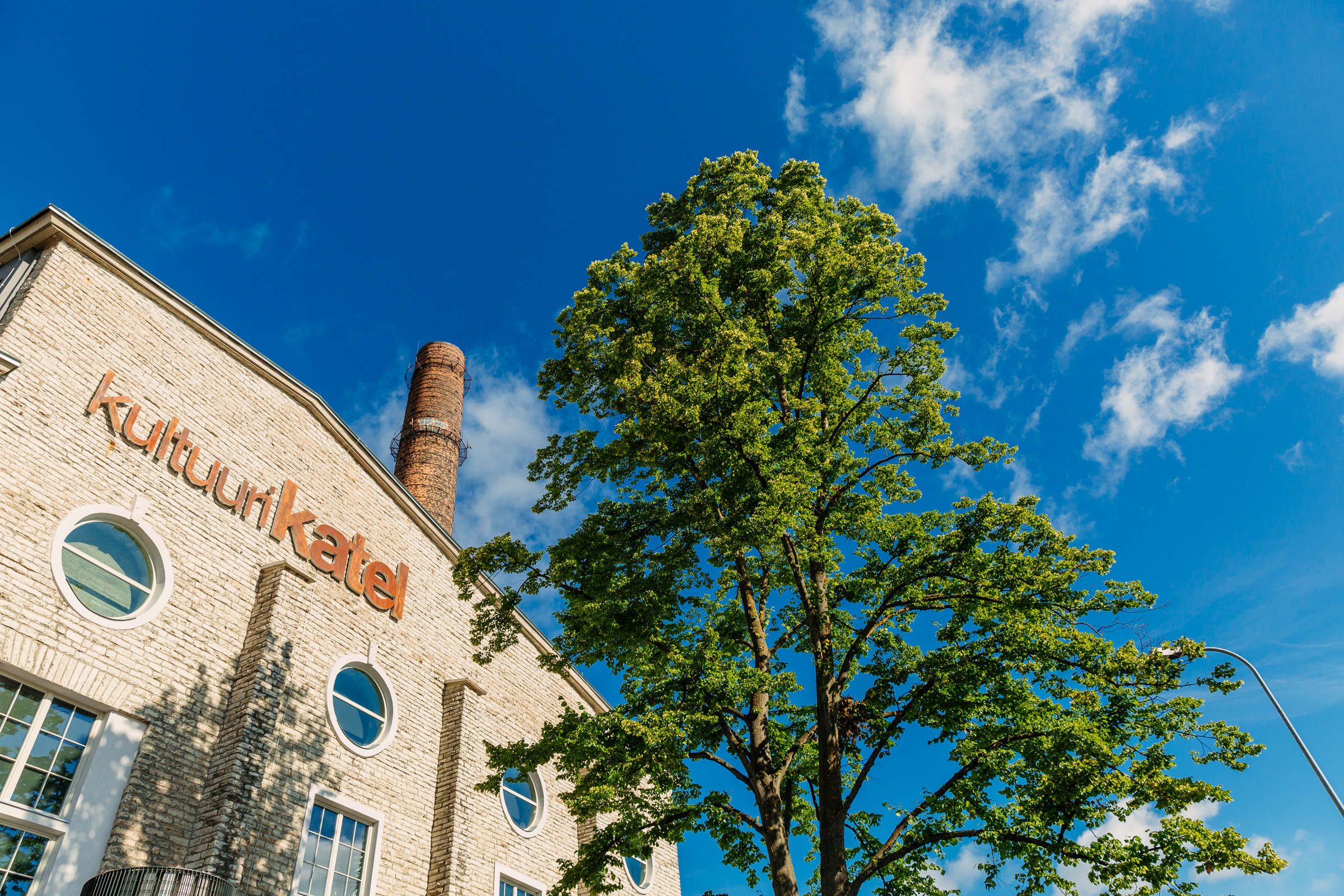
Kultuurikatel

Kultuurikatel, also called the Tallinn Creative Hub is a non-profit foundation and cultural organisation in Tallinn, Estonia situated in the Tallinn Power Plant and a medium between international culture, creative industry and private sector. Kultuurikatel organises events, workshops, performances. Each year it hosts the Stalker Festival and is a partner in the Tallinn Music Week.

The organisation is managed by the Tallinna Kultuurikatel foundation, founded in 2007 by the City of Tallinn. The aim of the organisation is to develop the cultural life of Tallinn and Estonia in cooperation with other organisations. The organisation also runs an active artist-in-residence program to serve professional artists from different fields of culture. The organisation has several departments such as a sound lab, a maker lab, a digital and audio-visual lab, Toidulabor/a food lab.

The Cultural Hub is a continuation of the European Capital of Culture programme, following Tallinn’s designation as the European Capital of Culture in 2011. It is also a member of several international networks, such as ECOC (European Capitals of Culture), ENCATC (European Network on Cultural Management and Cultural Policy), ECBN (European Creative Business Network), Circostrada and Estonian Chamber of Service Industry. The historic buildings that house the organisation are entered in the Register of Cultural Monuments of Estonia as architectural landmarks.

== History of the buildings of the "Cauldron of Culture" ==
Kultuurikatel is located at the former Tallinn Power Plant complex, with the creation of which the use of electricity in Estonia became widespread.

In 1865, the Reval Gas Works began operating on the site of what is now Põhja Boulevard, primarily supplying streetlights in the city center and later also public buildings. In 1912–1913, the Reval (Tallinn) Power Station was built on the site of the gas plant, designed by architect Hans Schmidt (1880–?). It consisted of a machine building, a boiler house, and an administrative building; only the latter remains today. Until 1918, the power station ran on coal, then on peat and firewood, and in 1923, the station was converted to oil shale. In 1929, a new turbine hall building was constructed, partially replacing the previous buildings, and in 1932, a distribution building.

By 1934, a new boiler house with limestone walls was ready (designed by Estonian architects Herbert Johanson, and Eugen Habermann, constructed by Ferdinand Adolff).

== Notable events ==
Kultuurikatel has hosted many local and international artists, including Roger Sanchez, 5MIINUST, Paul Kalkbrenner, Rag'n'Bone Man, Chase & Status, Tom Odell, and Ewert and the Two Dragons.

In 2017, the Kultuurikatel was used for events of the Estonian Presidency of the Council of the European Union.
