= Lõunaküla =

Village in Estonia

- Village
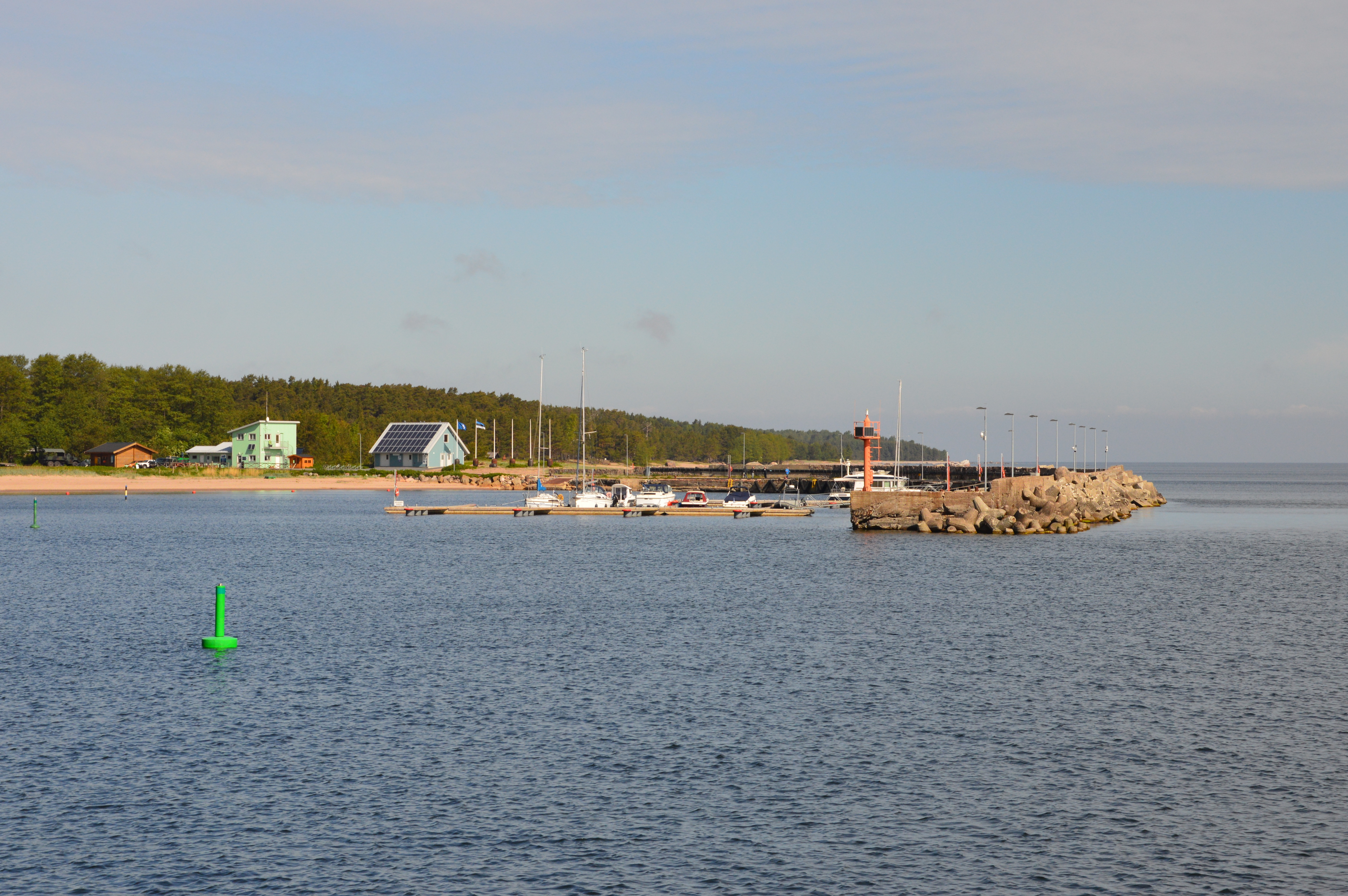
- Naissaare harbour

- Location within Estonia
- Coordinates: 59.5394°N 24.5328°E
- Country: Estonia
- County: Harju County
- Parish: Viimsi Parish
- Time zone: UTC+2 (EET)
  - Summer (DST): UTC+3 (EEST)

Lõunaküla (Swedish: Storbyn) is a village in Viimsi Parish, Harju County in Estonia. It is one of the three villages located on the island of Naissaar, the others being Tagaküla and Väikeheinamaa.

The Naissaar Museum is located east of the village center of Lõunaküla.

== Gallery ==
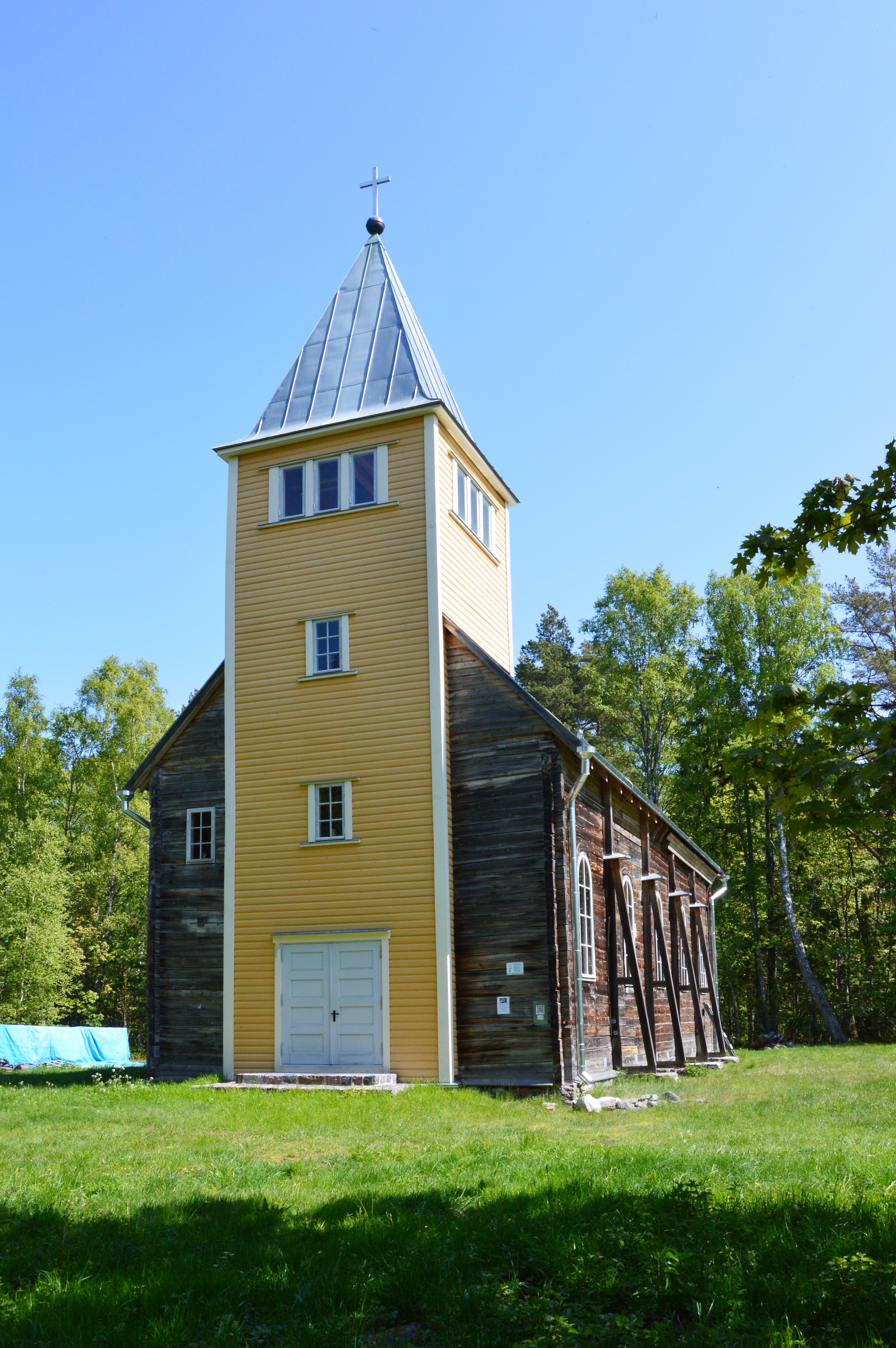
Naissaare St. Mary's Church

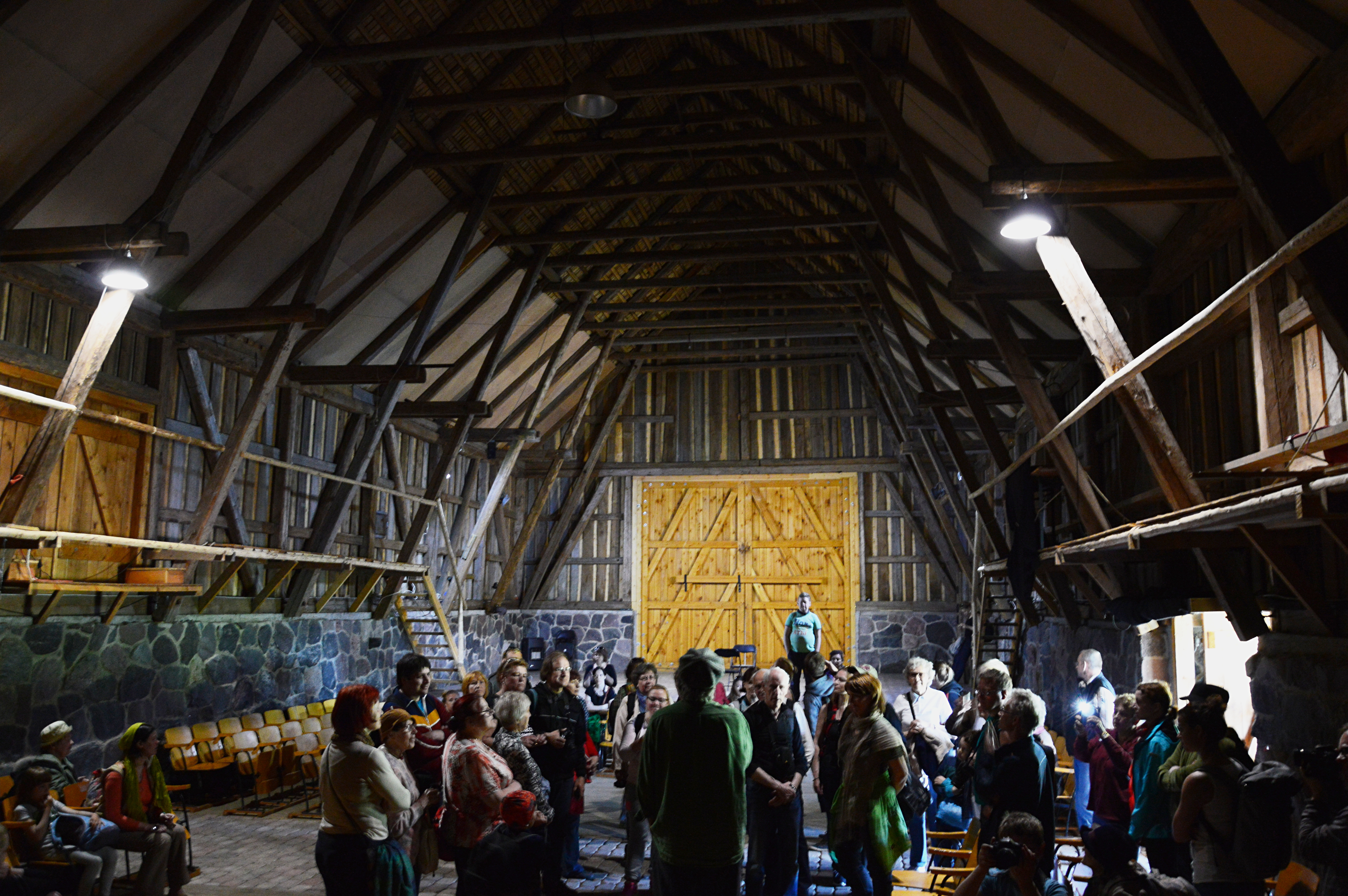
Omar's Barn, musical event venue

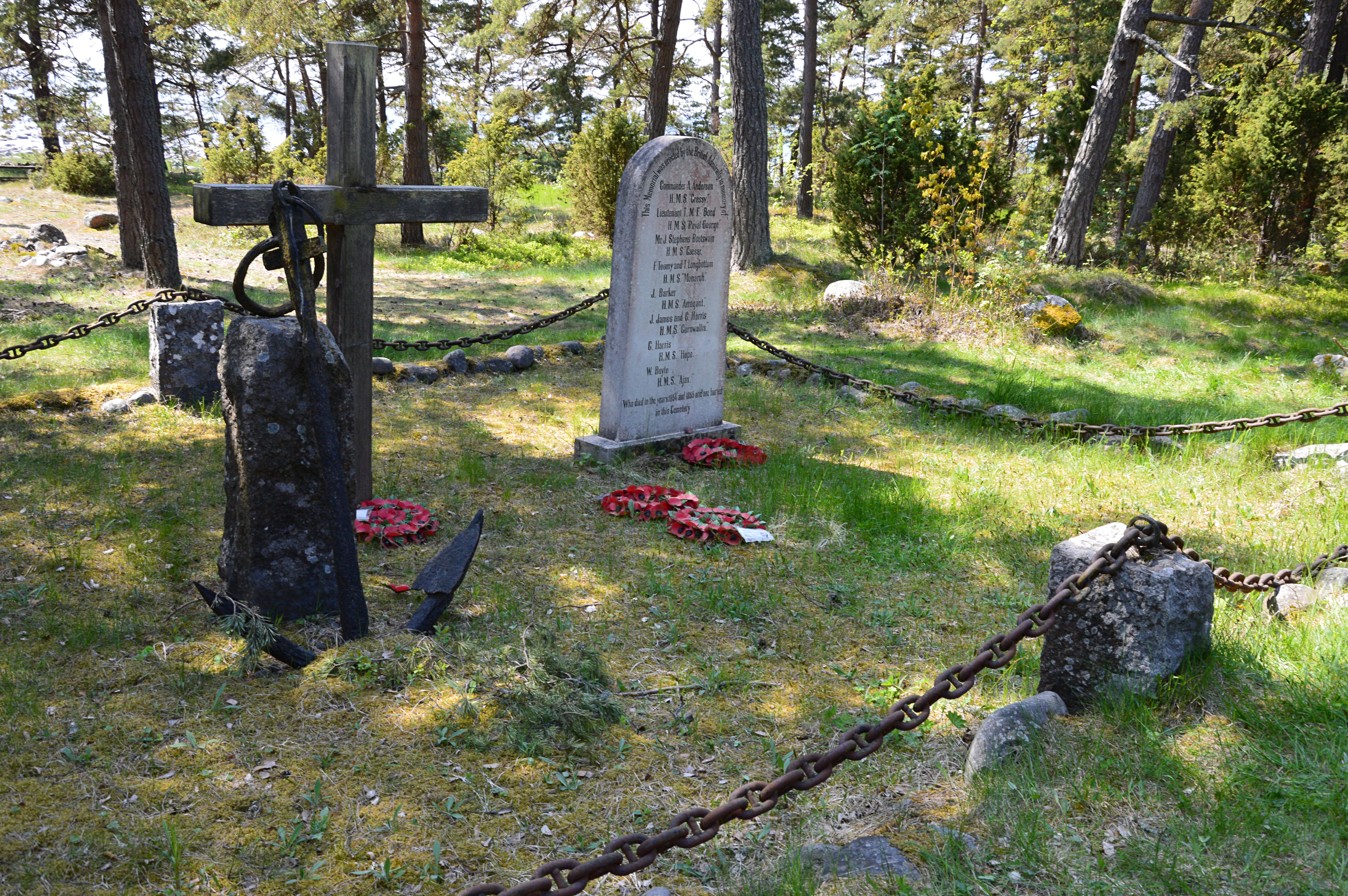
British navy memorial in Naissaare cemetery

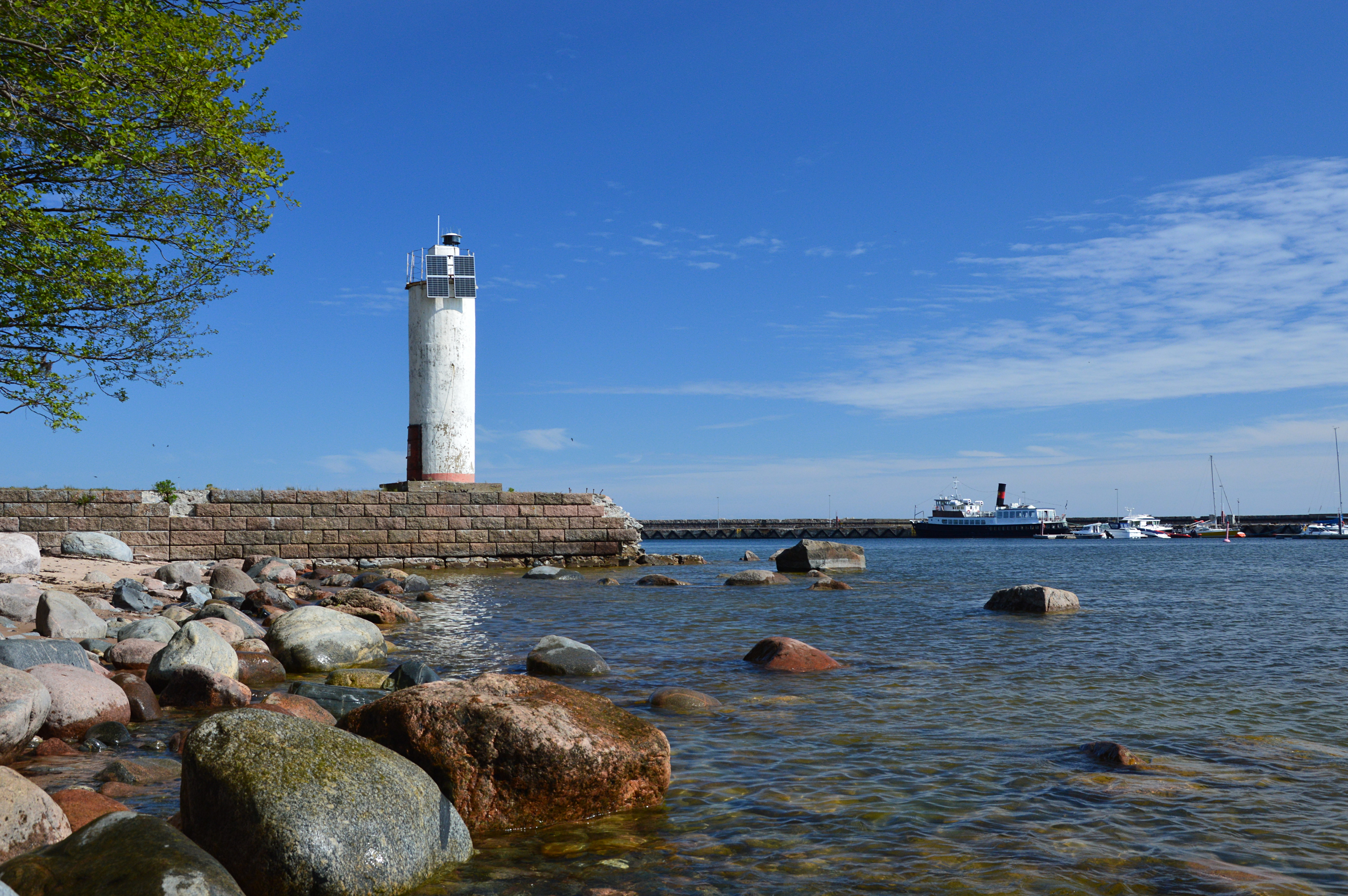
Light beacon in Naisaaare harbour

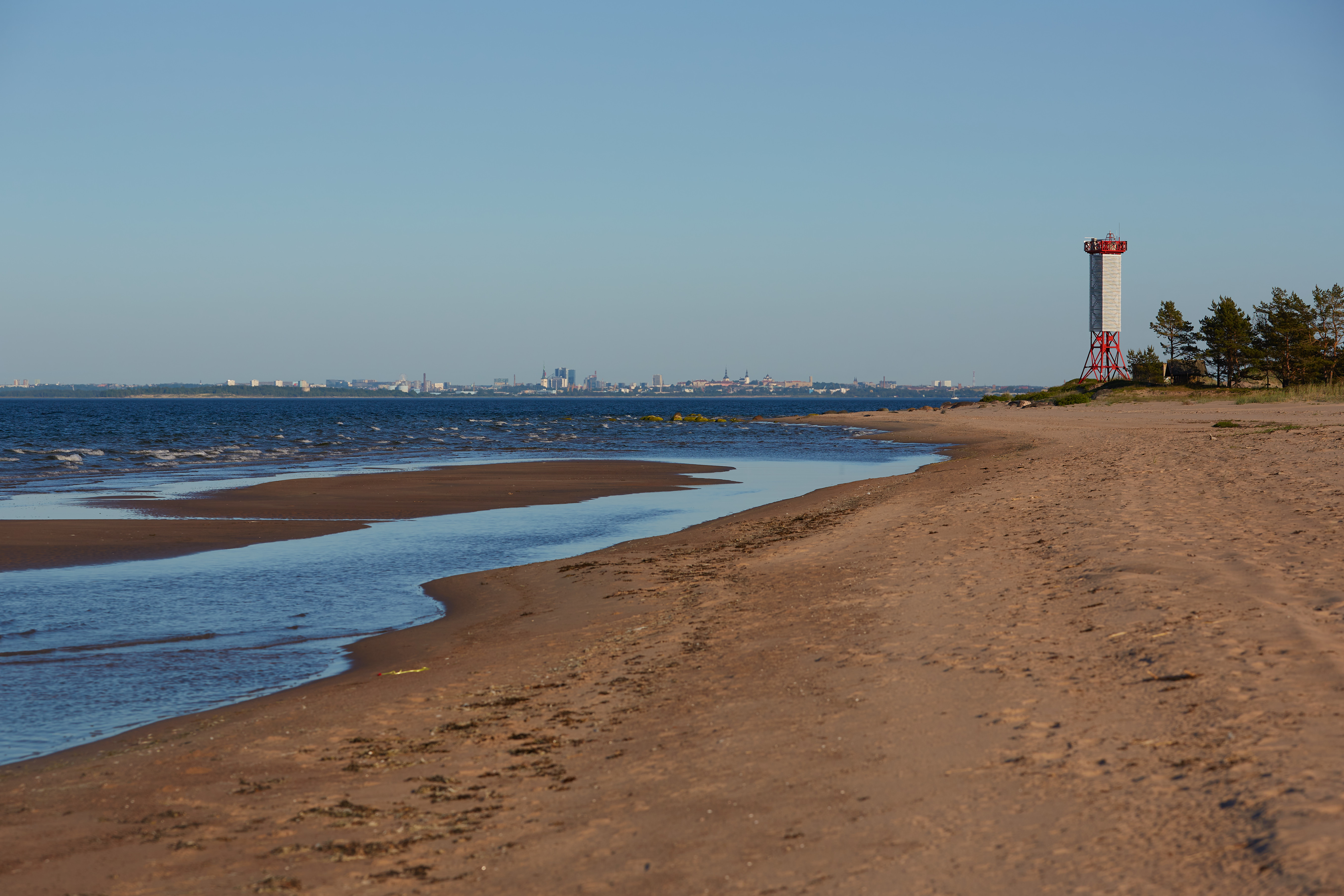
Light beacon in Hülkari, the southeastern point, and the panorama of Tallinn

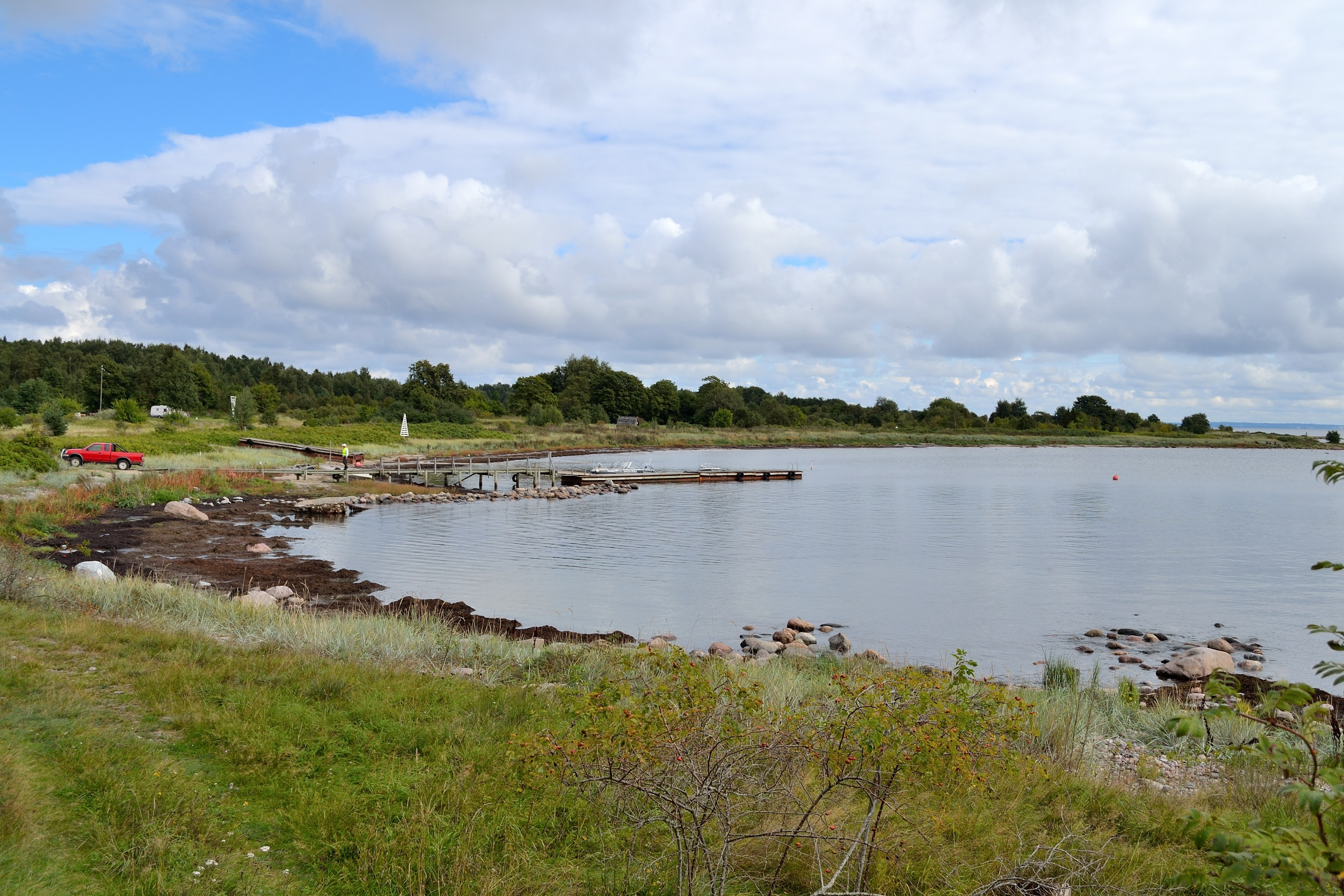
Southern coast of Naisaar
