= Tagaküla, Harju County =

Village in Estonia

- Village
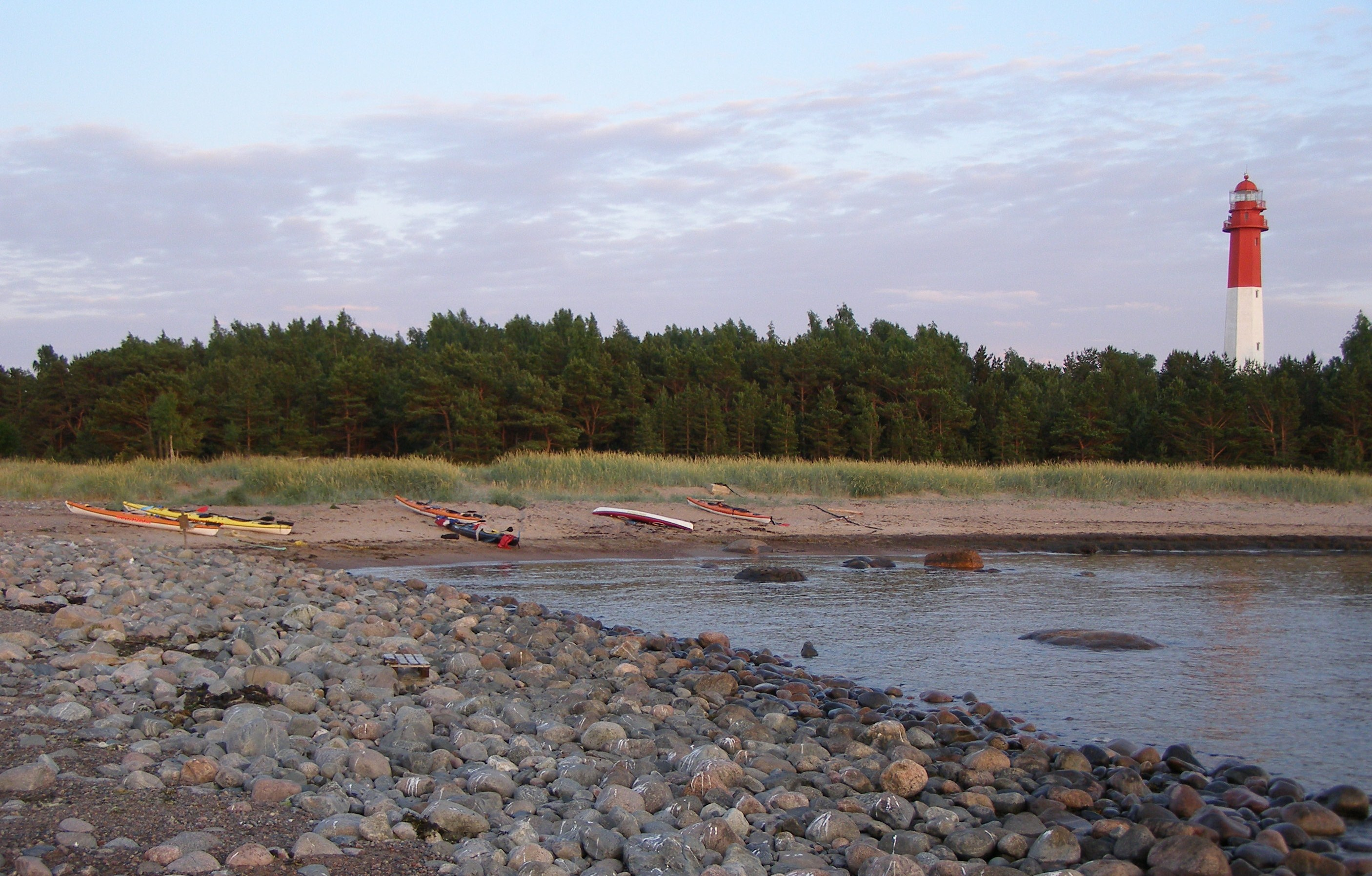

- Location within Estonia
- Coordinates: 59.5792°N 24.5322°E
- Country: Estonia
- County: Harju County
- Parish: Viimsi Parish
- Time zone: UTC+2 (EET)
  - Summer (DST): UTC+3 (EEST)

Tagaküla (Swedish: Bakbyn) is a village in Viimsi Parish, Harju County in Estonia. It is one of the three villages located on the island of Naissaar, the others being Lõunaküla and Väikeheinamaa.

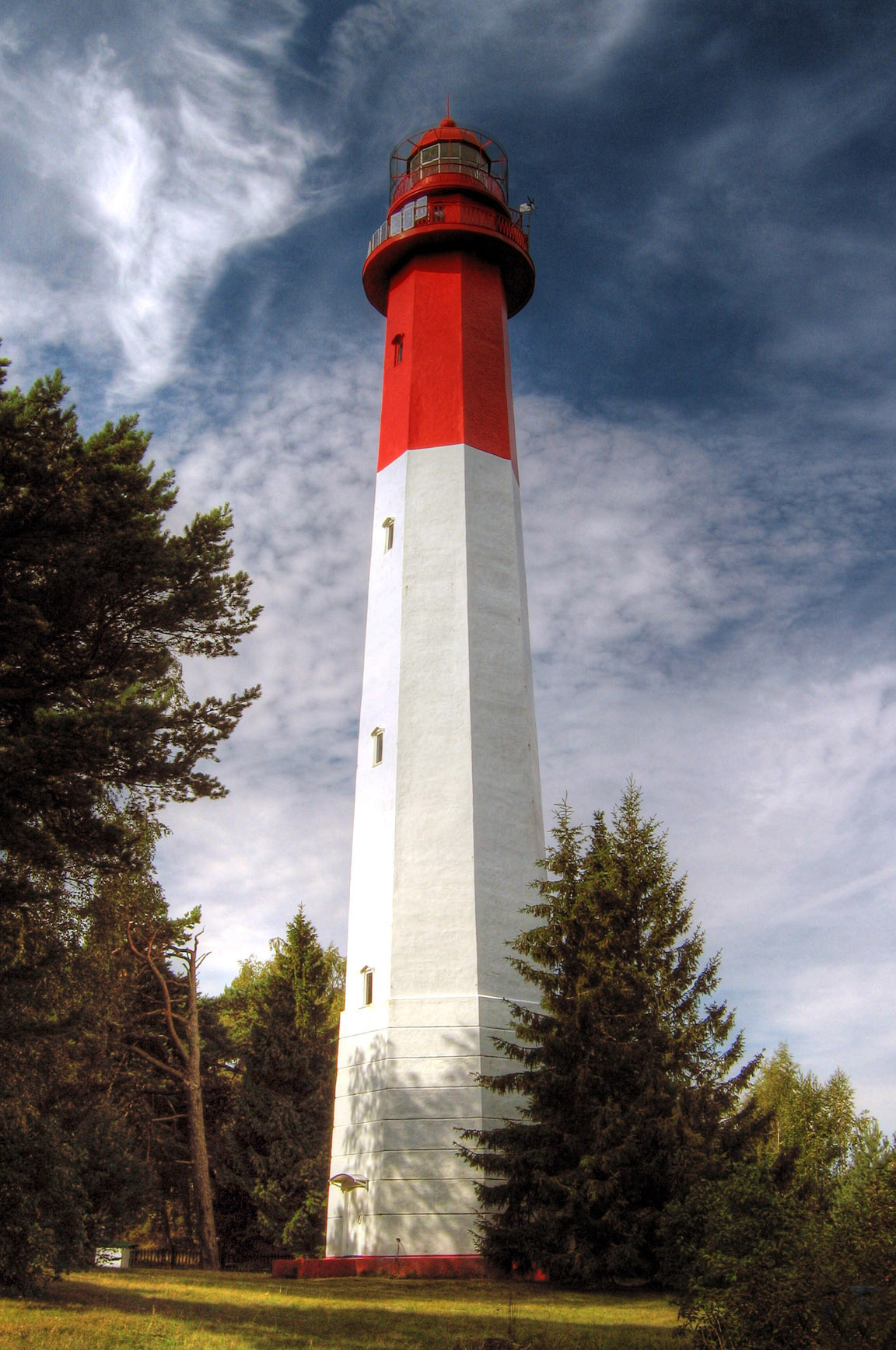
Naissaare lighthouse

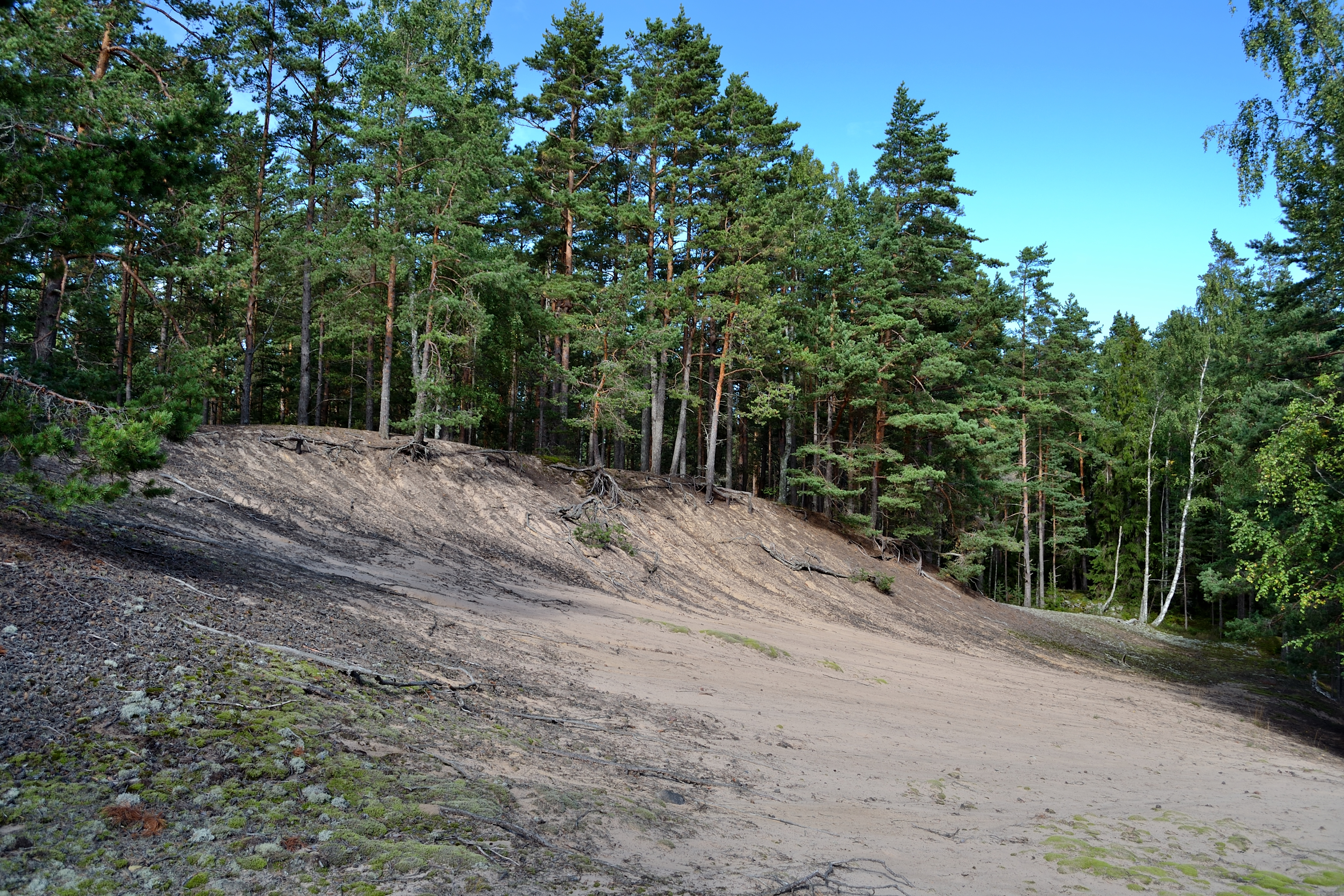
Highest sand dunes on the island

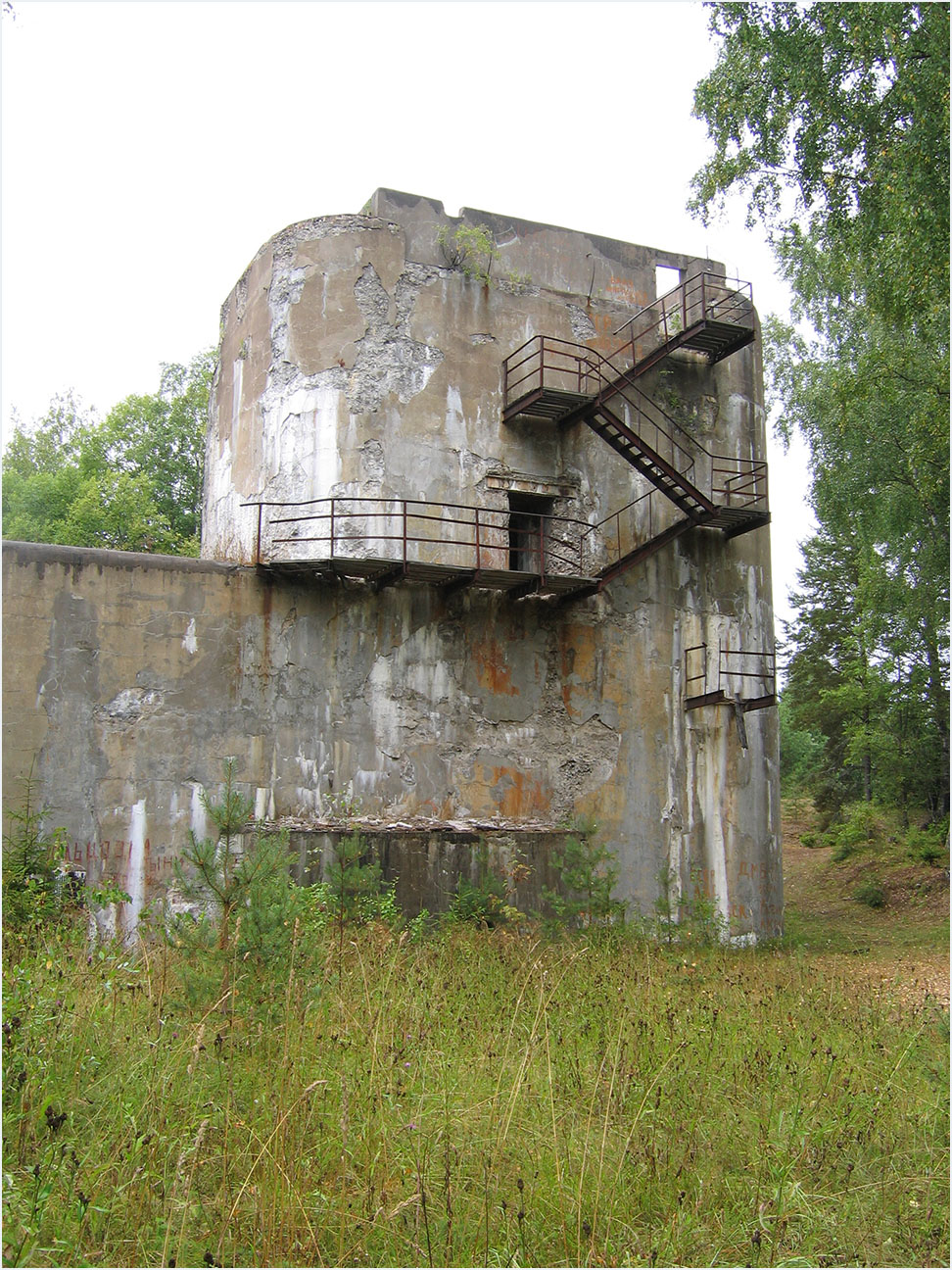
Naisssare coastal battery

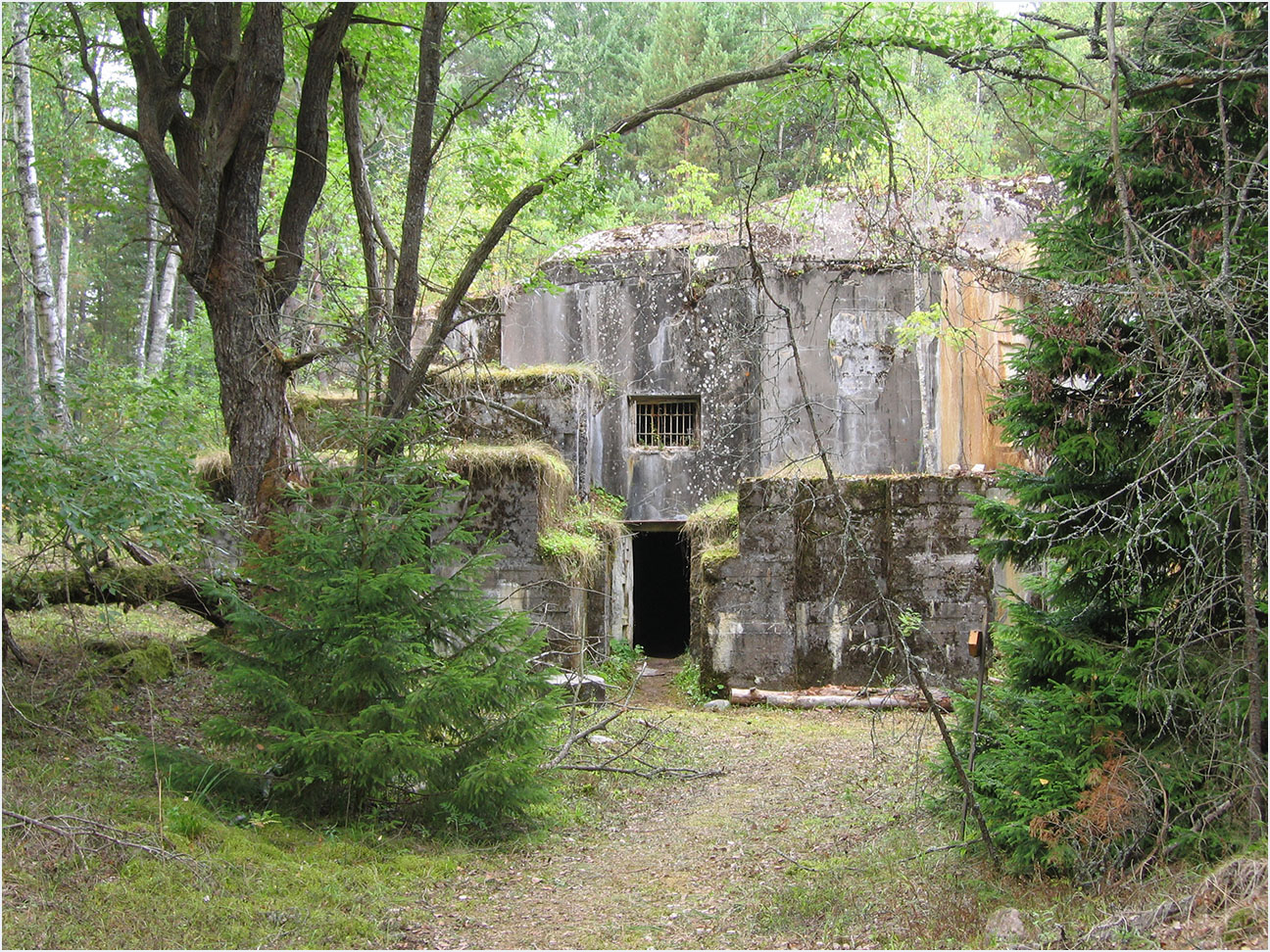
Naisssare coastal battery

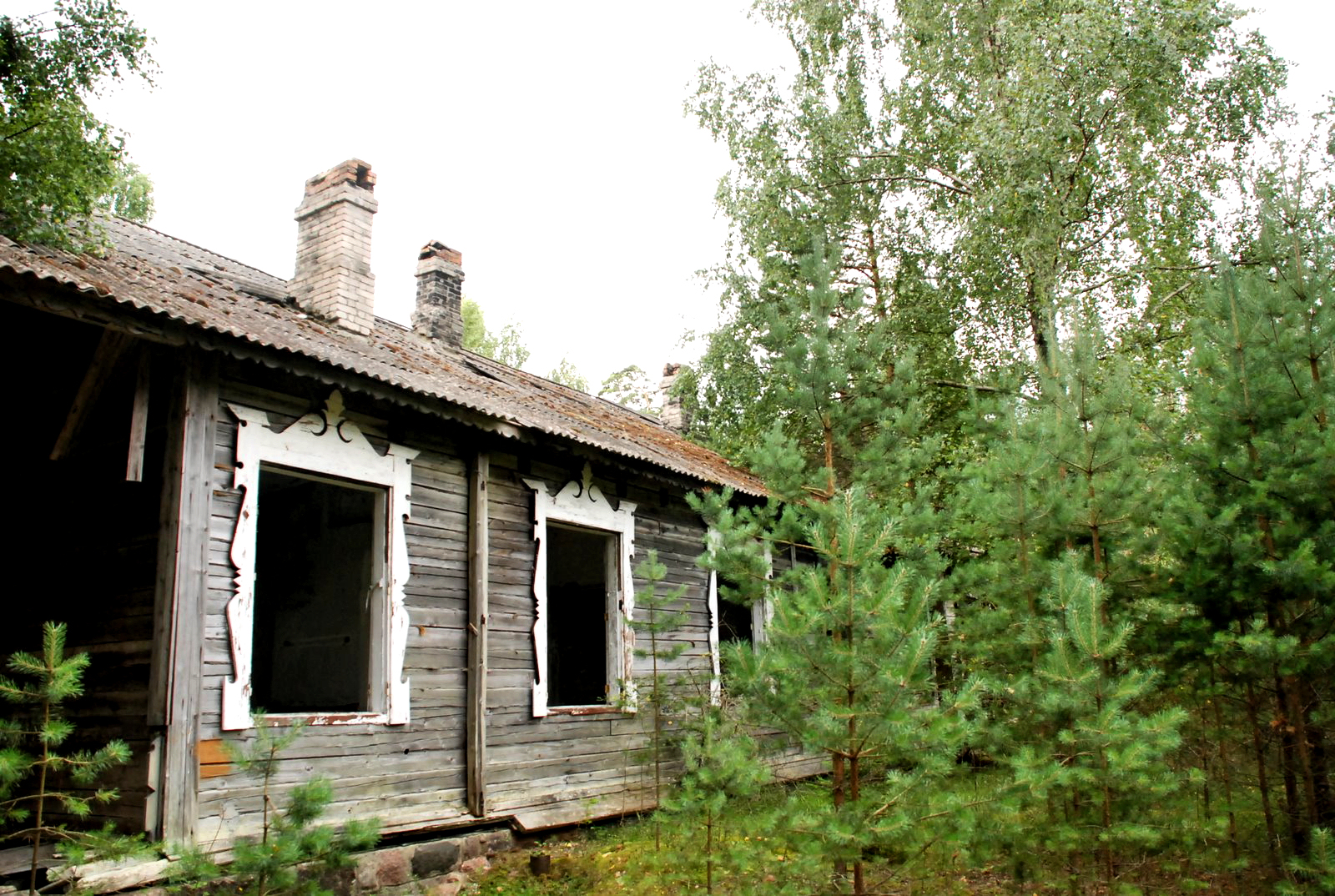
Officers' casino building
