= Äigrumäe =

Village in Estonia

- Village
- Location in Estonia
- Coordinates: 59°29′08″N 24°53′27″E
- Country: Estonia
- County: Harju County
- Municipality: Viimsi Parish

Population (01.01.2011)
  - Total: 138

Äigrumäe is a village in Viimsi Parish, Harju County in northern Estonia. It is located about 9 km (6 mi) northeast of the centre of Tallinn, situated just east of Tallinn's subdistricts Mähe and Lepiku. Äigrumäe has a population of 138 (as of 1 January 2011).

Äigrumäe is reachable from the centre of Tallinn by Tallinn Bus Company's route no. 8 (Viru keskus – Äigrumäe) with an average traveling time of 25 minutes, and also by less frequent route no. 38 (Viru keskus – Muuga).
