= Metsakasti =

Village in Estonia

- Village
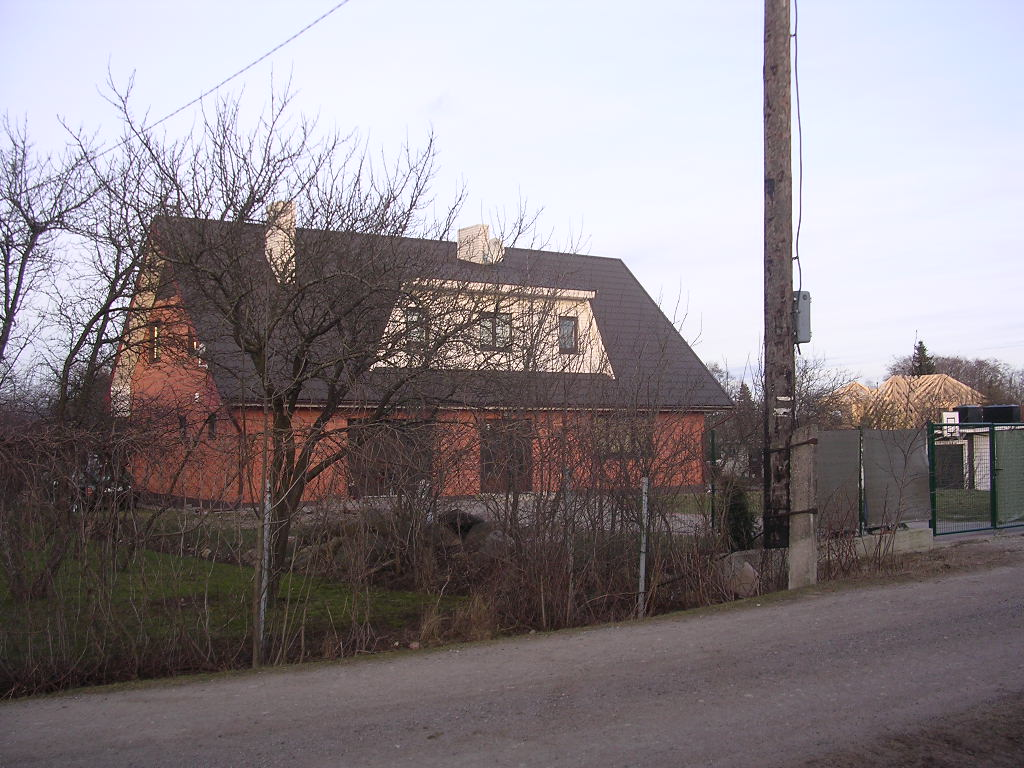
- House in Metsakasti

- Location in Estonia
- Coordinates: 59°29′36″N 24°53′27″E
- Country: Estonia
- County: Harju County
- Municipality: Viimsi Parish

Population (2011 Census)
  - Total: 772

Metsakasti is a village in Viimsi Parish, Harju County in northern Estonia. It is located about 10 km (6 mi) northeast of the centre of Tallinn, situated just northeast of Tallinn's subdistrict Mähe before the village of Randvere. As of the 2011 census, the settlement's population was 772, of which the Estonians were 549 (71.1%).

Metsakasti is connected to the centre of Tallinn by Tallinn Bus Company's route no. 38 (Viru keskus – Muuga); the average travel time is about 30 minutes.
