= Kelvingi =

Village in Estonia

- Village
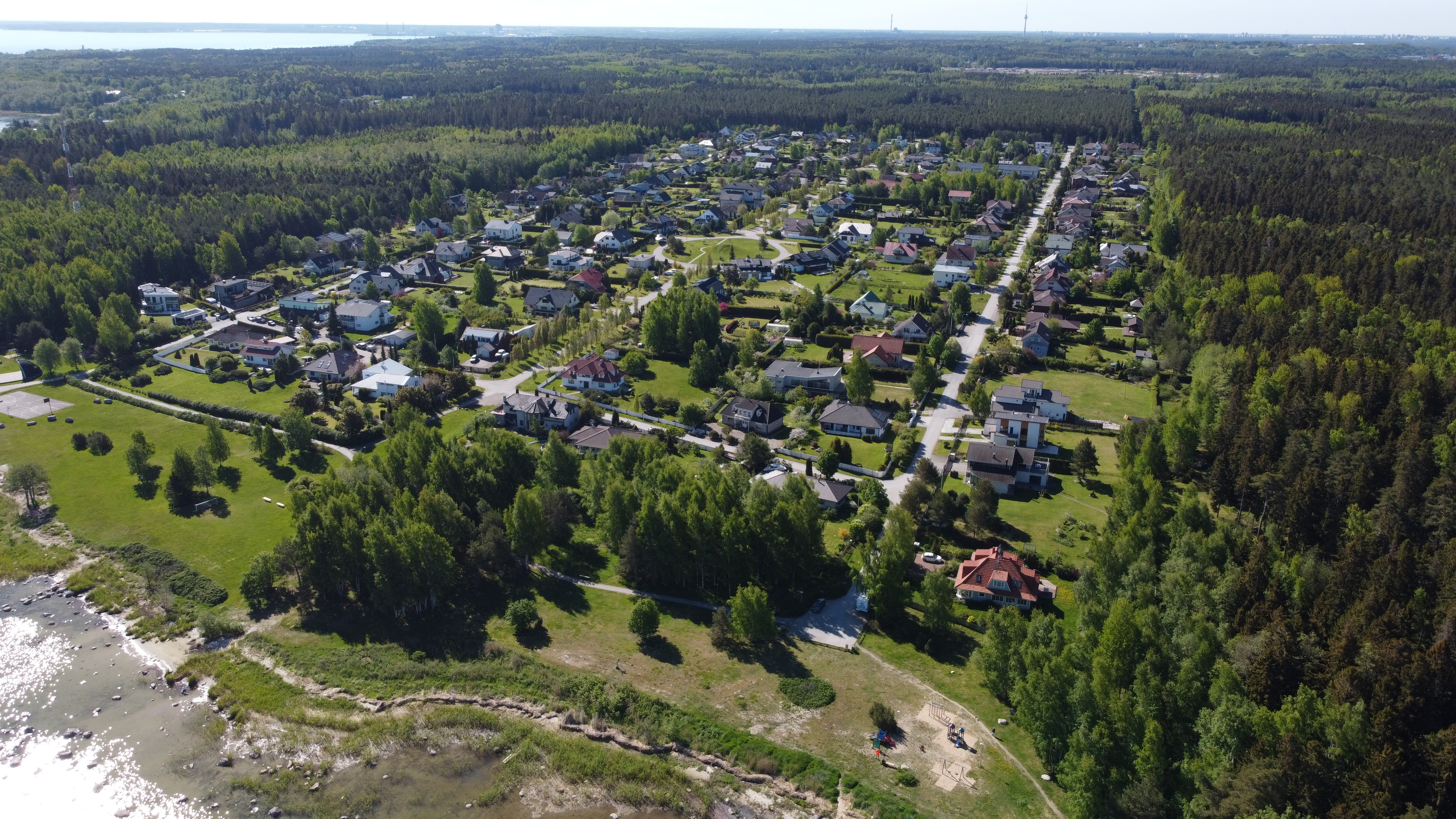

- Location in Estonia
- Coordinates: 59°32′56″N 24°50′20″E
- Country: Estonia
- County: Harju County
- Municipality: Viimsi Parish
- Founded: 1993

Government
  - Village elder: Jesper Jazel

Population (2011 census)
  - Total: 518

Drone video of Kelvingi in June 2022

Kelvingi is a village in Viimsi Parish, Harju County in northern Estonia. It's located about 13 km (8 mi) northeast of the centre of Tallinn, situated on the northern coast of the Viimsi Peninsula, between the villages of Rohuneeme and Leppneeme. As of the 2011 census, the settlement's population was 518.

Kelvingi was established in 1993 on the territory of a former Soviet military shooting range.

There is a small harbour, a preschool, and a society house in Kelvingi.
