= Pärnamäe =

Village in Estonia

- Village
- View at newly built houses in Pärnamäe.

- Location in Estonia
- Coordinates: 59°30′05″N 24°52′08″E
- Country: Estonia
- County: Harju County
- Municipality: Viimsi Parish

Population (01.01.2011)
  - Total: 1,191

Pärnamäe is a village in Viimsi Parish, Harju County in northern Estonia. It's located about 9 km (6 mi) northeast of the centre of Tallinn, situated just north of Tallinn's subdistrict Mähe and east of the settlement Viimsi. Pärnamäe has a population of 1,191 (as of 1 January 2011).
