= Lubja =

Village in Estonia

Coordinates: 59°31′N 24°51′E

- Village
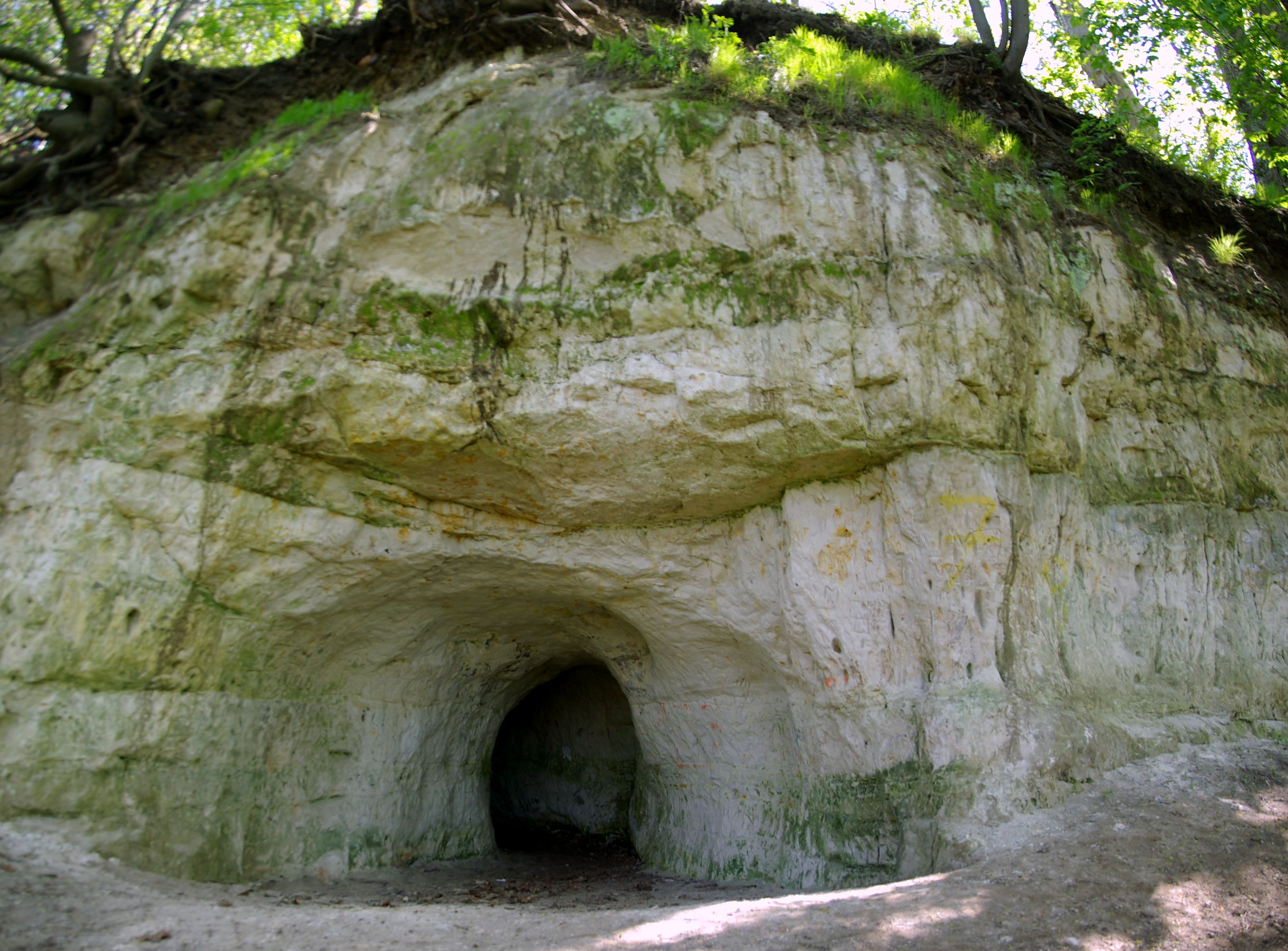
- Kuradikoobas ('Devil's Cave') in Lubja village
- Interactive map of Lubja
- Country: Estonia
- County: Harju County
- Parish: Viimsi Parish
- Time zone: UTC+2 (EET)
  - Summer (DST): UTC+3 (EEST)

Lubja is a village in Viimsi Parish, Harju County in northern Estonia.
