= Laiaküla =

Village in Estonia

- Village
- Location in Estonia
- Coordinates: 59°28′03″N 24°54′49″E
- Country: Estonia
- County: Harju County
- Municipality: Viimsi Parish

Population (2011 Census)
  - Total: 740

Laiaküla is a village in Viimsi Parish, Harju County in northern Estonia. It is located about 10 km (6 mi) east of the centre of Tallinn. Laiaküla is an exclave of Viimsi Parish, situated between Tallinn and Maardu. As of the 2011 census, the settlement's population was 740, of which the Estonians were 461 (62.3%). Laiaküla is reachable from the centre of Tallinn by Tallinn Bus Company's route no. 34 (Viru keskus – Muuga aedlinn); the average travel time is about 29 minutes (the stop's name is Käära).
