= Viimsi Parish =

Municipality of Estonia

Coordinates: 59°32′N 24°51′E

Viimsi Parish Viimsi vald
- Municipality of Estonia
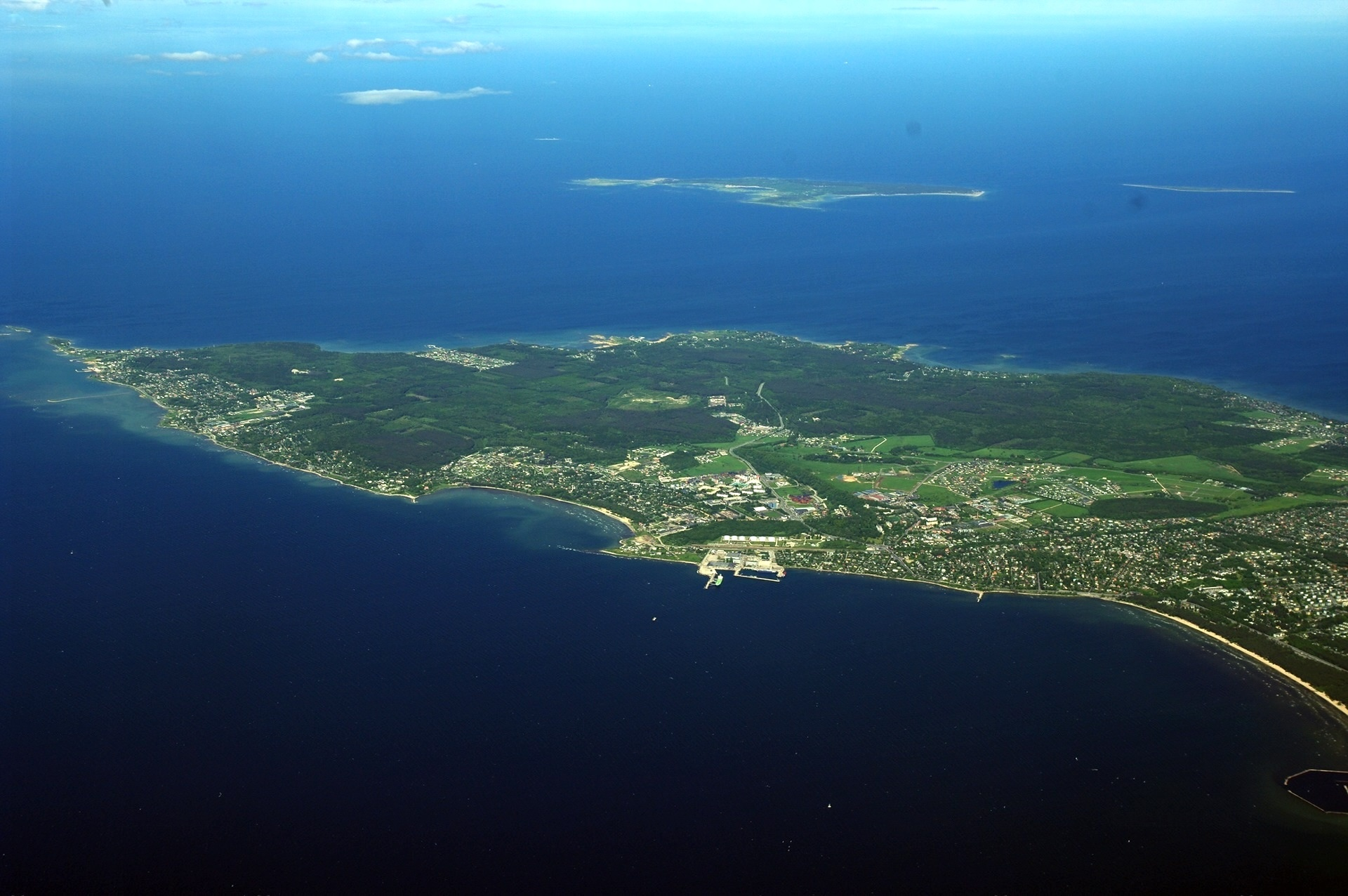
- View of Viimsi Peninsula from the air above Tallinn Bay

- Flag Coat of arms

- Viimsi Parish within Harju County.
- Country: Estonia
- County: Harju County
- Administrative centre: Viimsi

Government
  - Mayor: Illar Lemetti (Estonian Reform Party)

Area
  - Total: 72.84 km^{2} (28.12 sq mi)

Population (2025)
  - Total: 22 935
  - Density: 0.30/km^{2} (0.78/sq mi)
- ISO 3166 code: EE-890
- Website: www.viimsivald.ee

Viimsi Parish (Estonian: Viimsi vald) is a rural municipality in Northern Estonia, situated on the southern coast of the Gulf of Finland and neighbouring the capital Tallinn. With a population of 22,935 (as of 2025), Viimsi is considered to be the wealthiest municipality in Estonia.

The municipality contains the Viimsi Peninsula and several islands, including Naissaar, Prangli, and Aksi. It covers an area of 72.84 km^{2} (28.12 sq mi).

The flag and coat of arms of Viimsi Parish were designed by artist Tõnis Soop. The mayor of Viimsi Parish is Illar Lemetti.

== History ==
Archaeological evidence shows that Viimsi Peninsula has been inhabited since prehistoric times, with finds from the Neolithic and Bronze Age indicate permanent settlement dating back about 4,000 years. The first written record of Viimsi appears in the Danish Census Book of 1241, where the village of Uianra (pronounced Vianra) was mentioned.

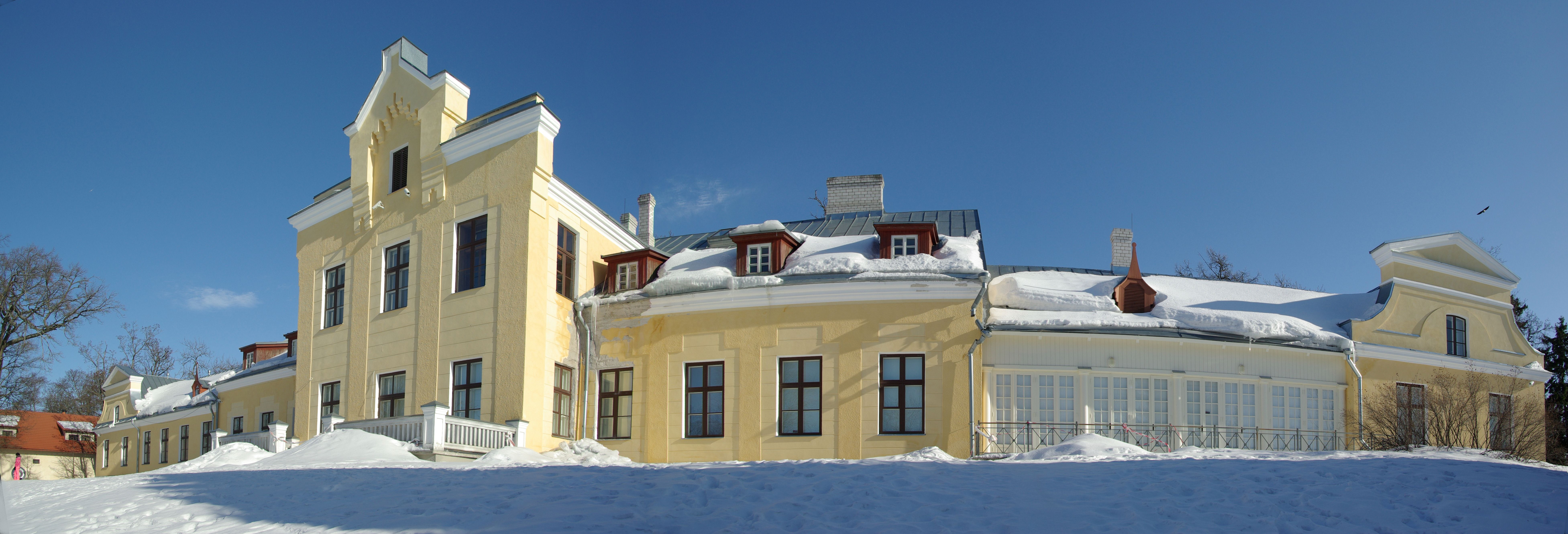
Viimsi Manor, now home to the Estonian War Museum

In 1471, the Pirita convent founded Viimsi Manor (mentioned as Wiems) which administered extensive lands on the peninsula. In 1866, a separate municipality was formed on the basis of Viimsi Manor, whose task was to organise the school, court and the fulfilment of certain state obligations. At that time, the municipalities were not territorial, but estate-based local governments, and the power of the municipality applied only to peasants.

After Estonia gained independence, the Viimsi Parish was officially established on 11 May 1919. In 1939, administrative reforms merged Viimsi with Iru Parish, and the area temporarily lost its municipal status.

During the Soviet occupation, Viimsi was part of a restricted coastal border zone. From the late 1940s, several fishing collectives were established in villages and in 1950, these were merged into the Kirov Fishing Kolkhoz, which became one of the largest enterprises in the region. The kolkhoz developed Miiduranna Harbour and engaged in fish processing, agriculture and greenhouse production.

Viimsi regained municipal status in December 1990 and following the Estonian Restoration of Independence, the area has transformed into a rapidly developing suburban municipality.

== Divisions ==
There are two small boroughs (alevik) and 20 villages (küla) in Viimsi Parish.

=== Small boroughs ===
Viimsi and Haabneeme.

=== Villages ===
Äigrumäe, Idaotsa, Kelnase, Kelvingi, Laiaküla, Leppneeme, Lõunaküla (Storbyn), Lubja, Lääneotsa, Metsakasti, Miiduranna, Muuga, Pringi, Pärnamäe, Püünsi, Randvere, Rohuneeme, Tagaküla (Bakbyn), Tammneeme, Väikeheinamaa (Lillängin).

== Population ==
The population of Viimsi Parish has seen a significant growth over the past decades, mainly driven by migration from Tallinn and new housing developments.

Population size 2001–2025
Year	Population
2001	5,758
2005	10,830
2010	16,232
2015	18,163
2020	20,728
2025	22,935

== Religion ==
Religion in Viimsi Parish (2021)
1. Unaffiliated (78.3%)
2. Lutheran (11.3%)
3. Orthodox (5.50%)
4. Others Christians (2.70%)
5. Others Religions (1.50%)
6. Unknown (0.70%)

== Sports ==
Viimsi is home to several sports clubs, namely football club Viimsi JK, basketball club KK Viimsi and handball club Viimsi HC. The Viimsi Stadium was opened in 2015, replacing the former stadium. In 2018, Karulaugu Forus Sports Centre was opened adjacent to the stadium, together forming a complex for football, basketball, tennis, athletics and wrestling. In 2025, the Viimsi indoor football and athletics hall (Viimsi jalgpalli- ja kergejõustikuhall) was built for €6.4 million.

In 2022, KK Viimsi notably reached the 2021–22 Latvian–Estonian Basketball League final and finished as silver medalists.

== Museums ==
- Viimsi Open Air Museum
- Museum of Coastal Folk
- Naissaar Museum
- Estonian War Museum

== International relations ==
=== Twin towns — Sister cities ===
Viimsi Parish is twinned with:

- Barleben, Germany
- Porvoo, Finland
- Ski Municipality, Norway
- Sulejówek, Poland
- Täby Municipality, Sweden
- Ramat Yishai, Israel

== Gallery ==
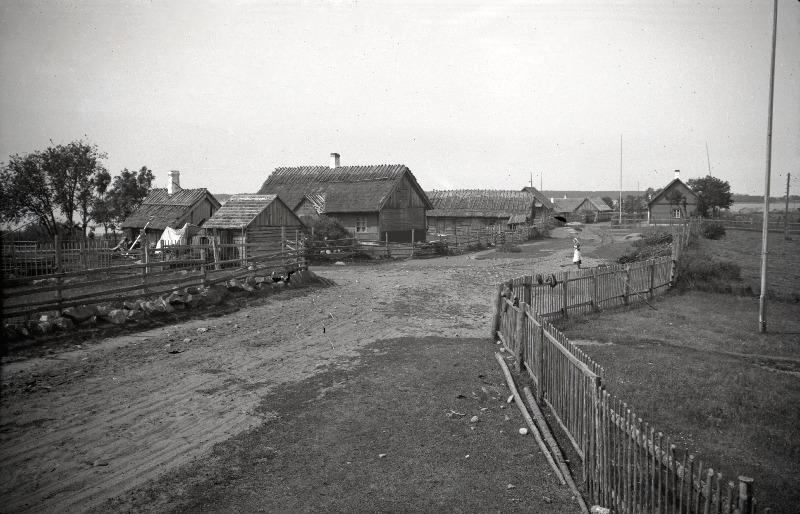
Rohuneeme in 1938

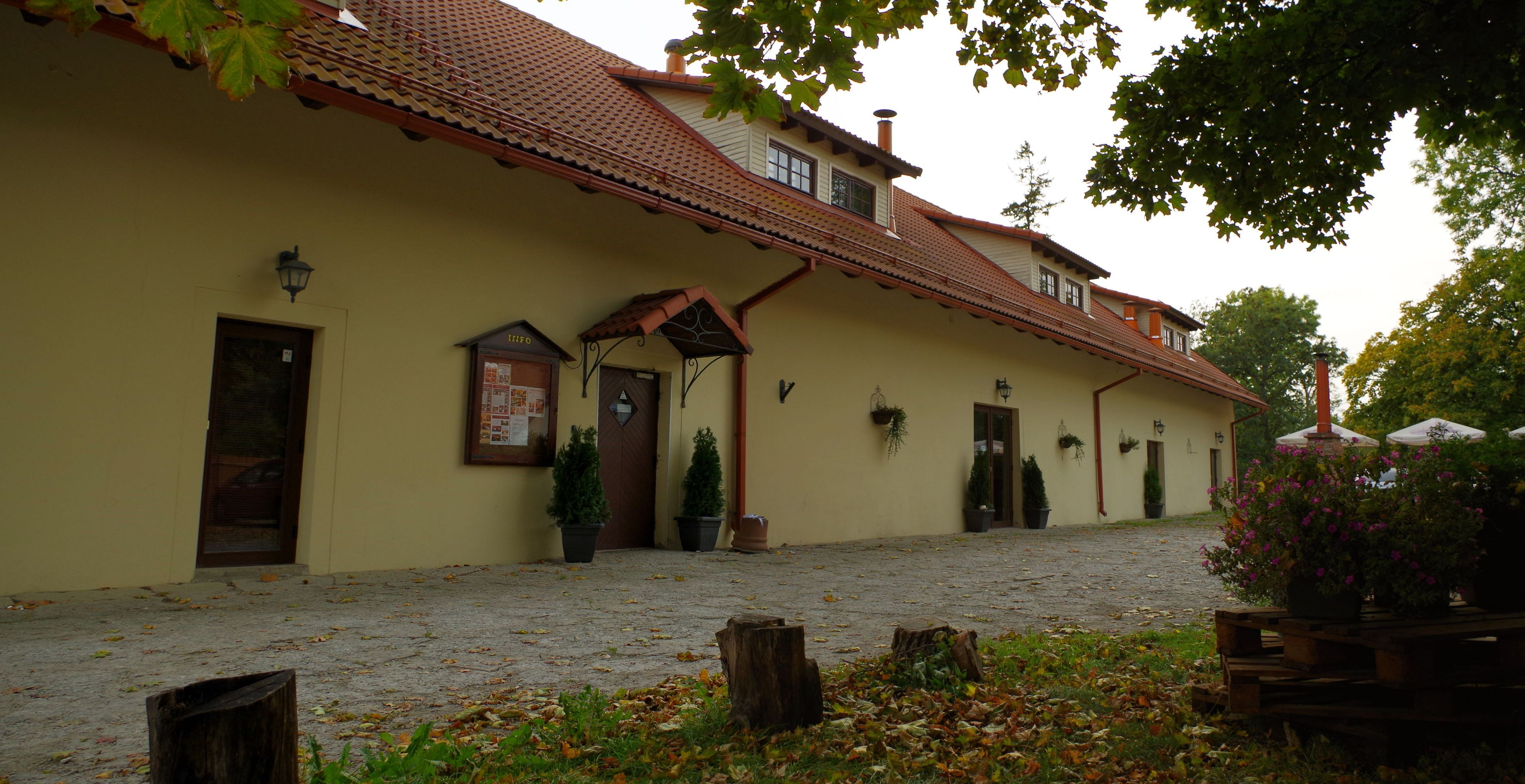
Buildings of the former Viimsi manor

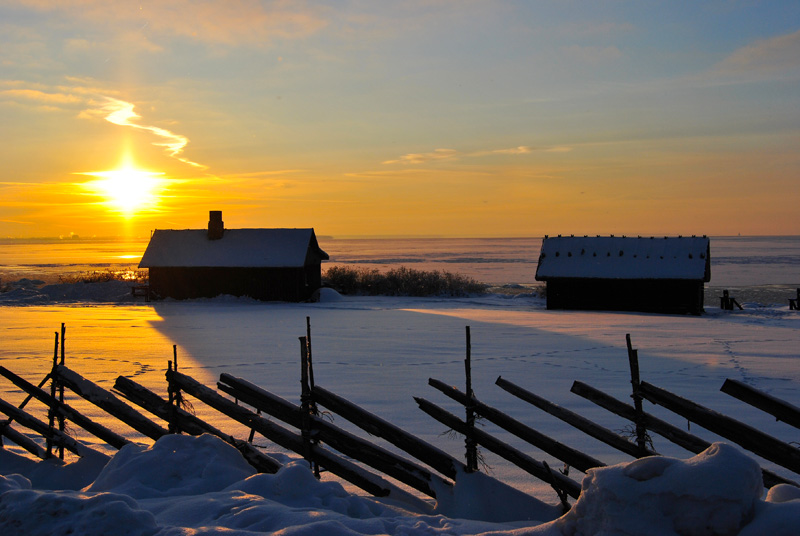
Viimsi Open Air Museum

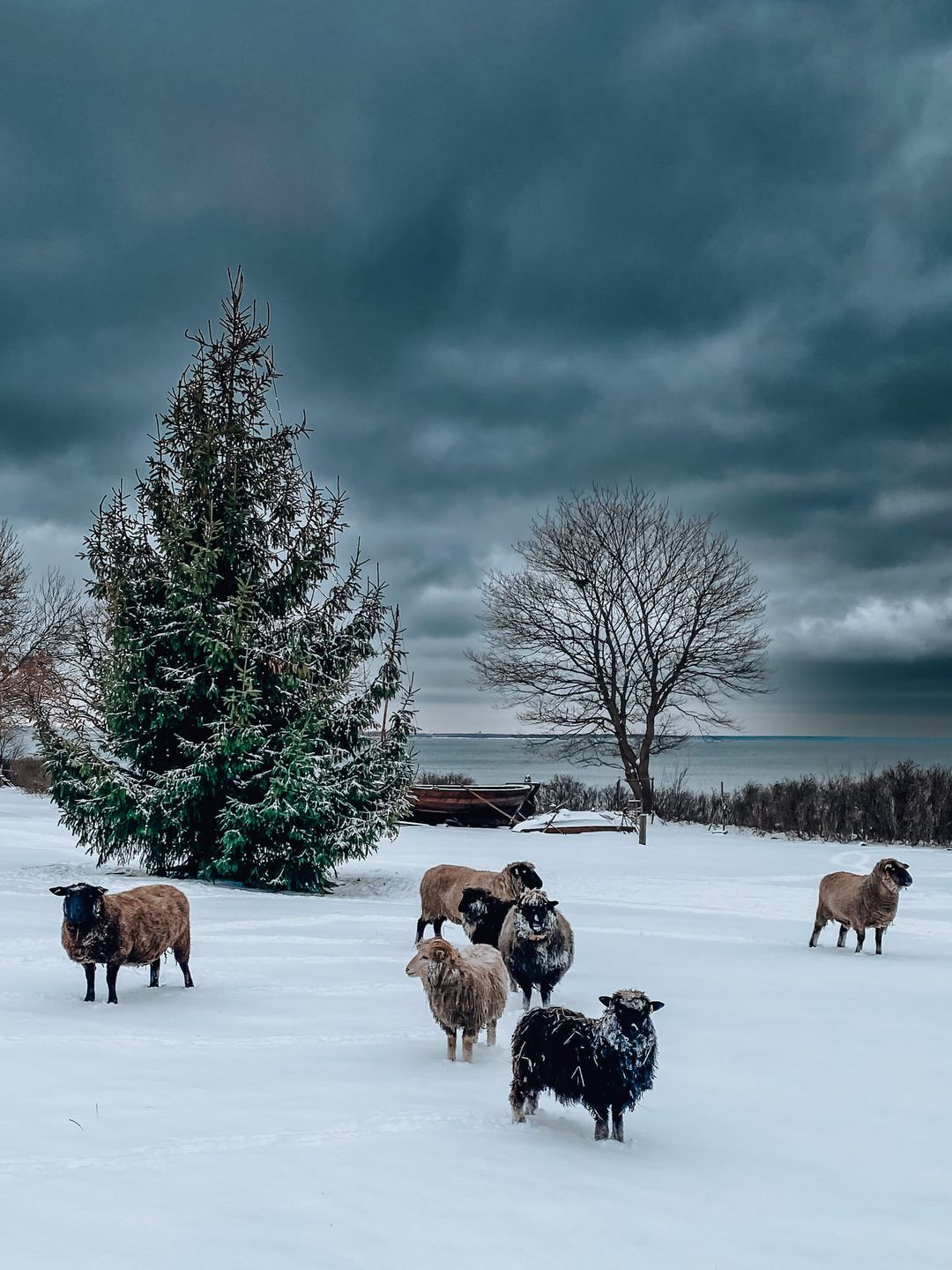
Viimsi Open Air Museum

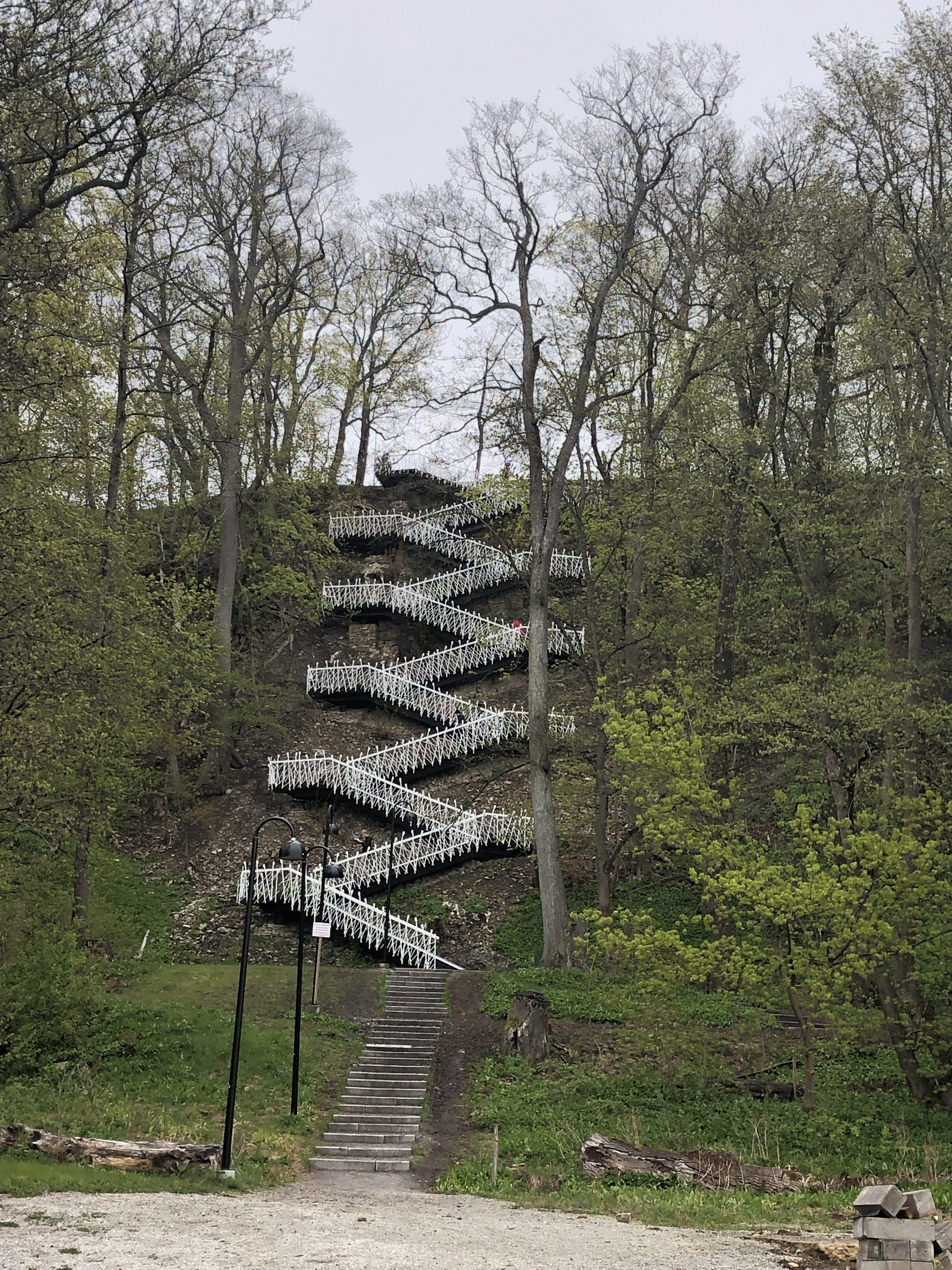
Põhjakonna stairs

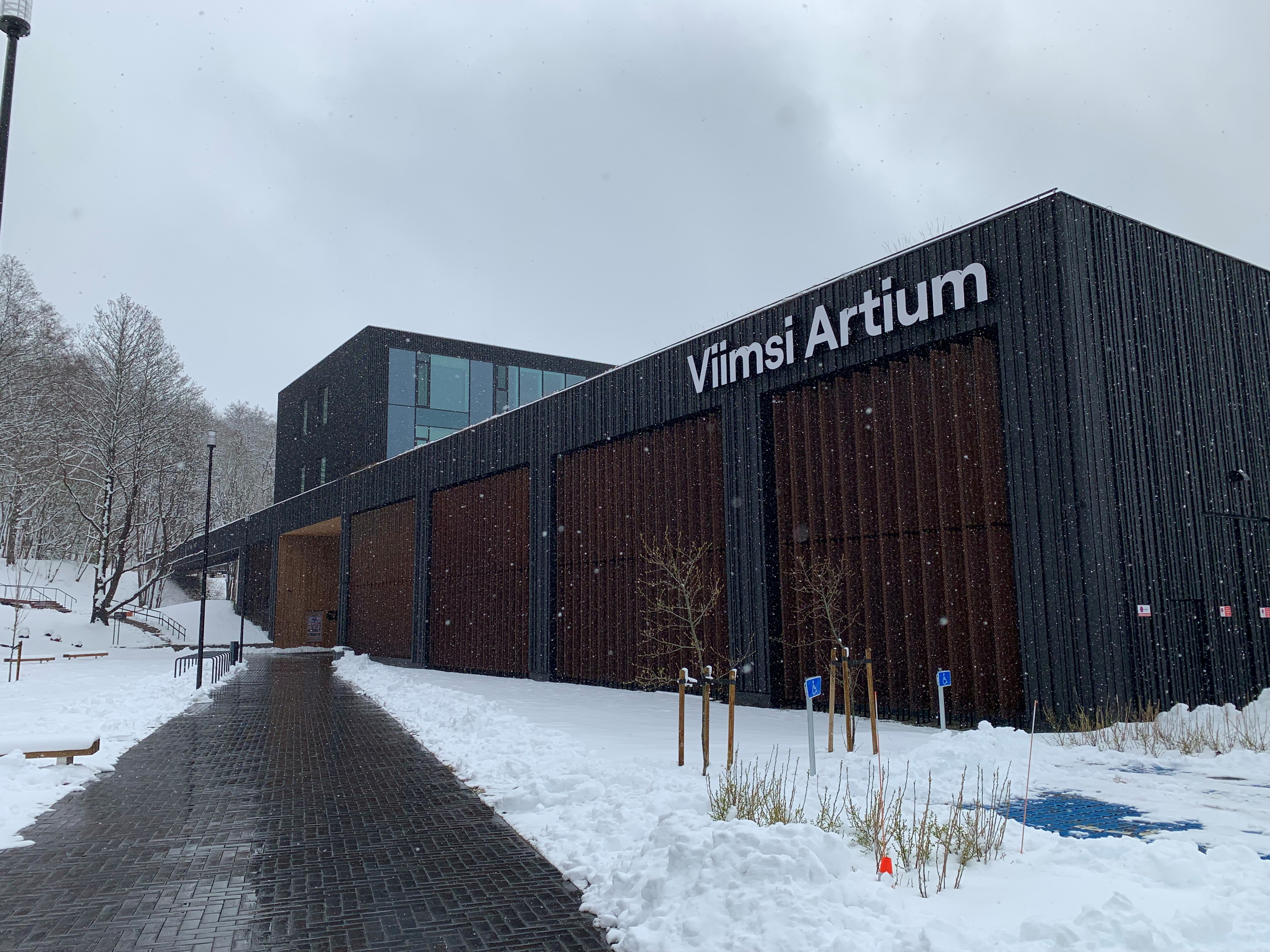
Viimsi Artium

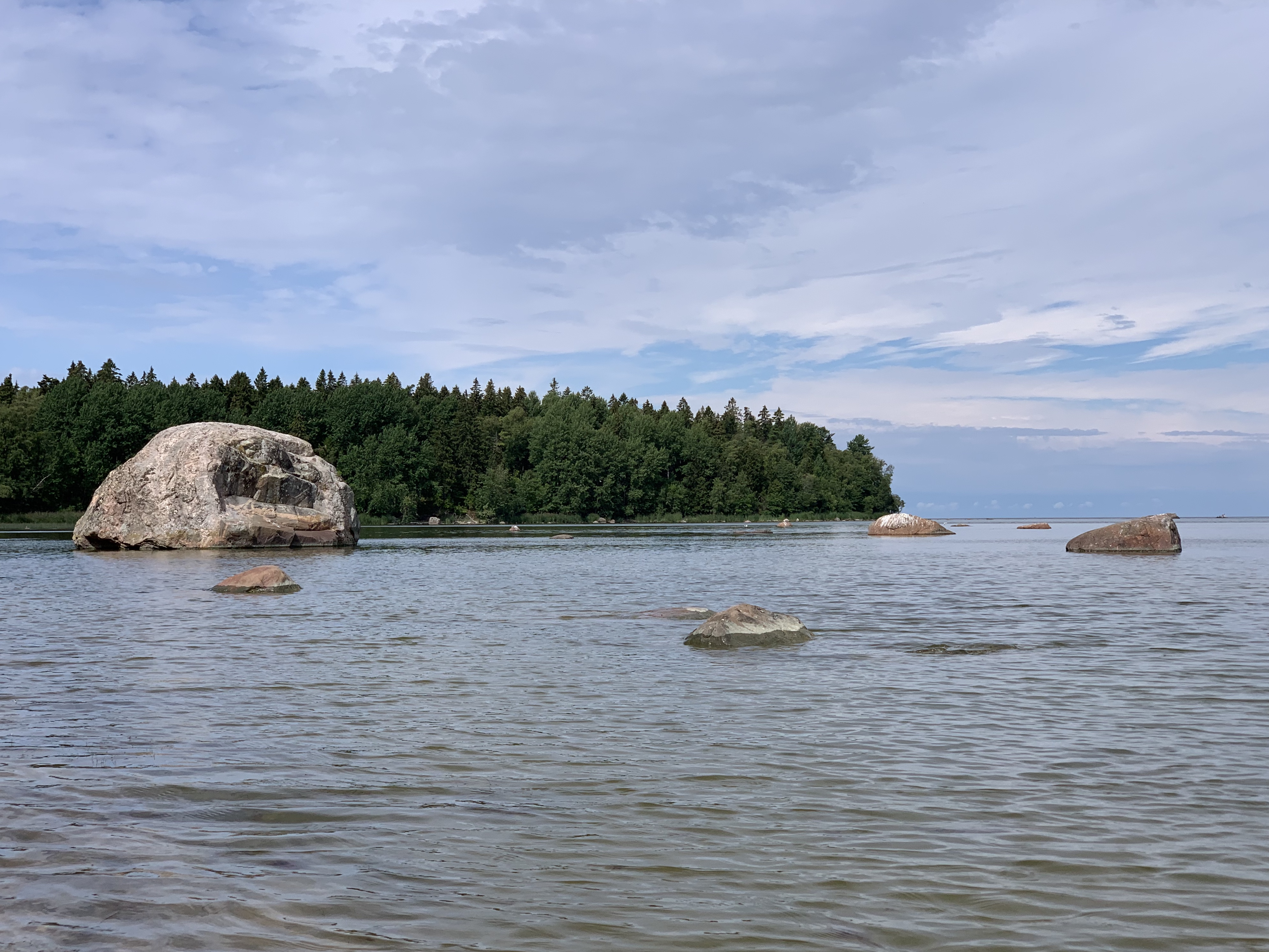
Rohuneeme

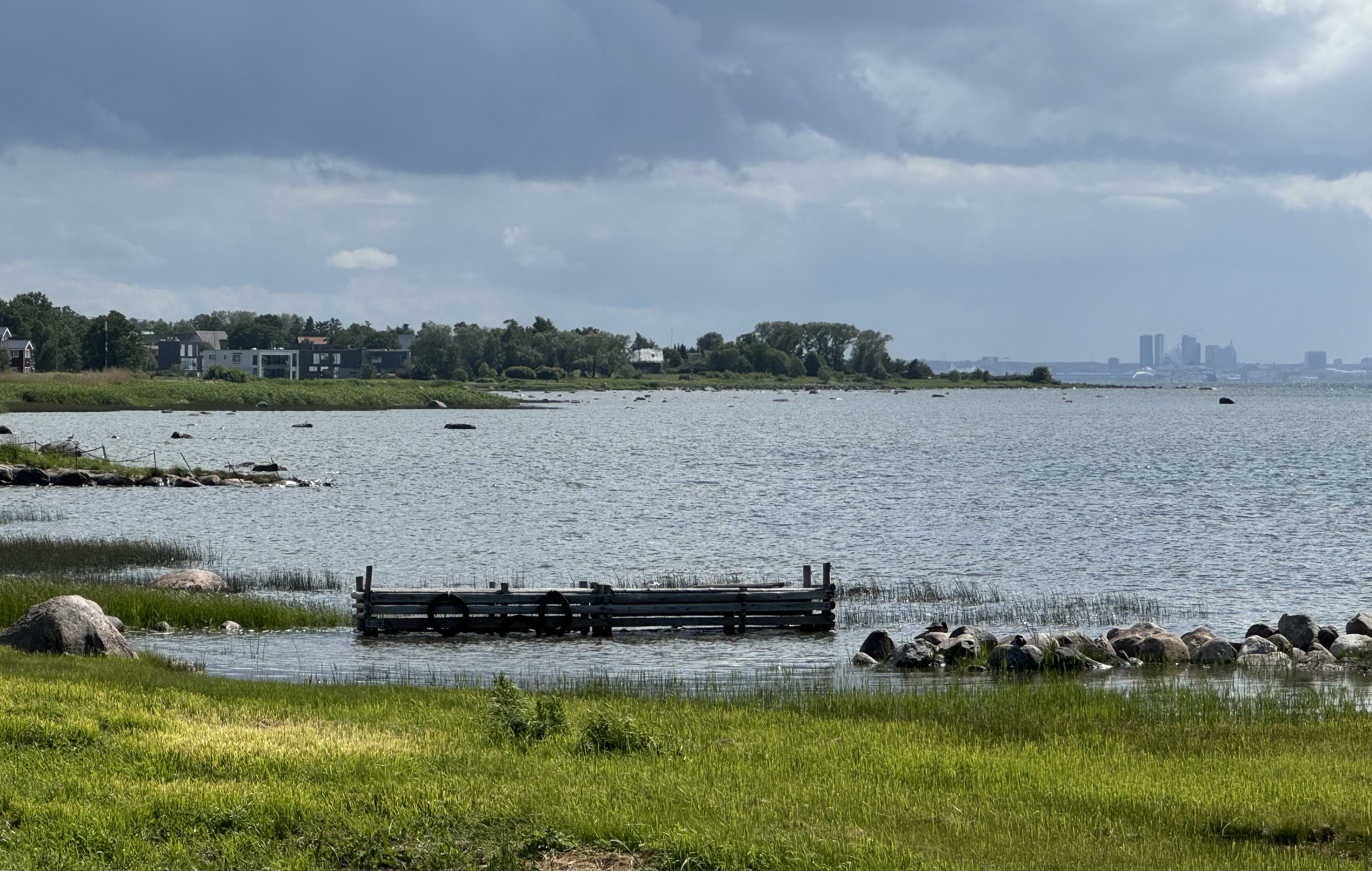
Püünsi

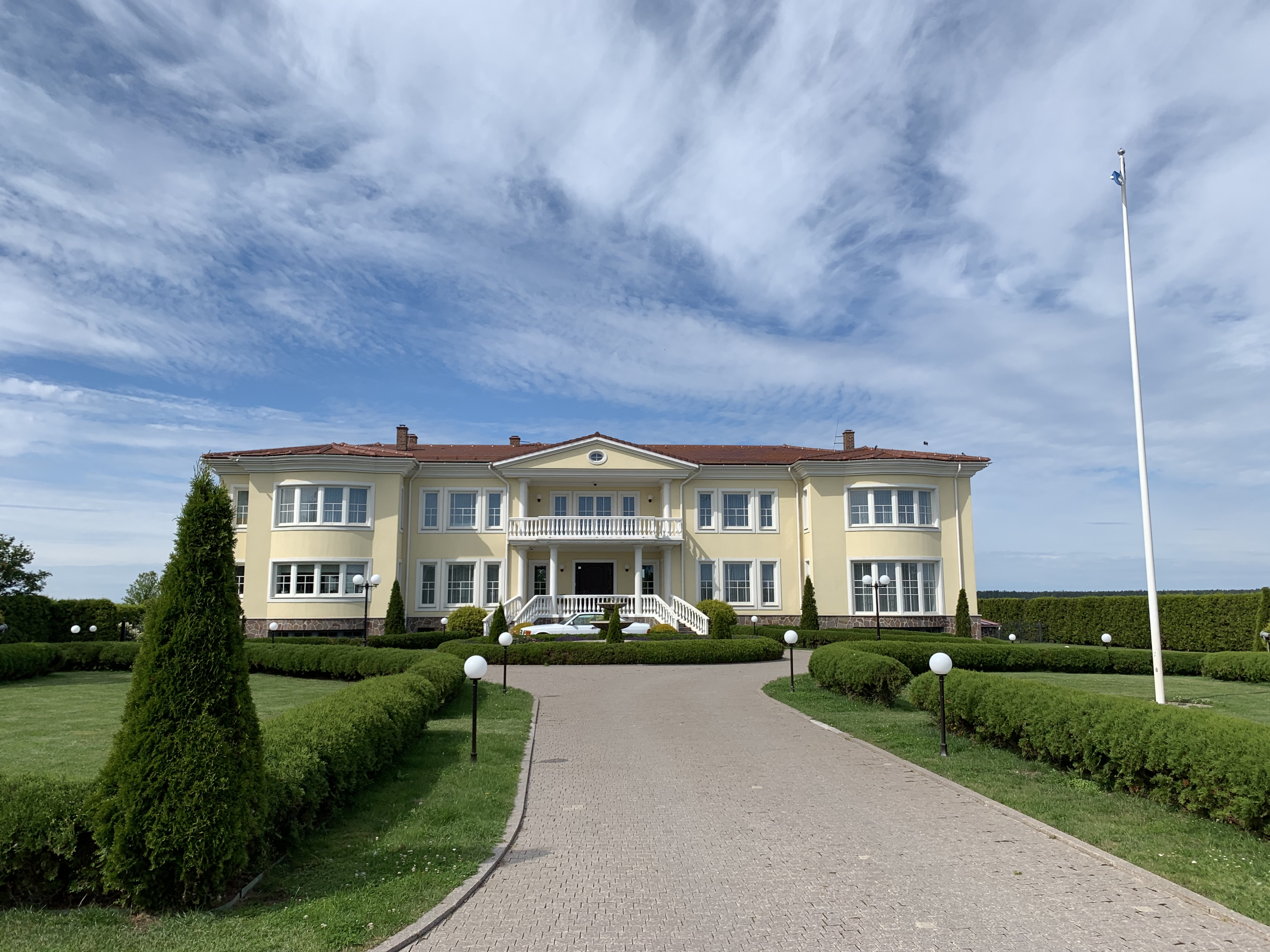
Private home in Viimsi

== Notable people ==
- Bernhard Schmidt (born 1879 on Naissaar - 1935), optician, he invented the Schmidt camera in the 1930's
- Erik Schmidt (born 1925 on Naissaar – 2014), a painter and writer, nephew of Bernhard Schmidt
- Tõnu Viik (born 1939 in Rohuneeme), astronomer and President of the Estonian Naturalists' Society 2008 to 2014
- Marko Meerits (born 1992 in Viimsi), footballer who has played over 300 games and 14 for Estonia
- Patrik Kristal (born 2007 in Viimsi Parish), footballer who has played about 150 games and 12 for Estonia
