= Püünsi =

Village in Estonia

- Village
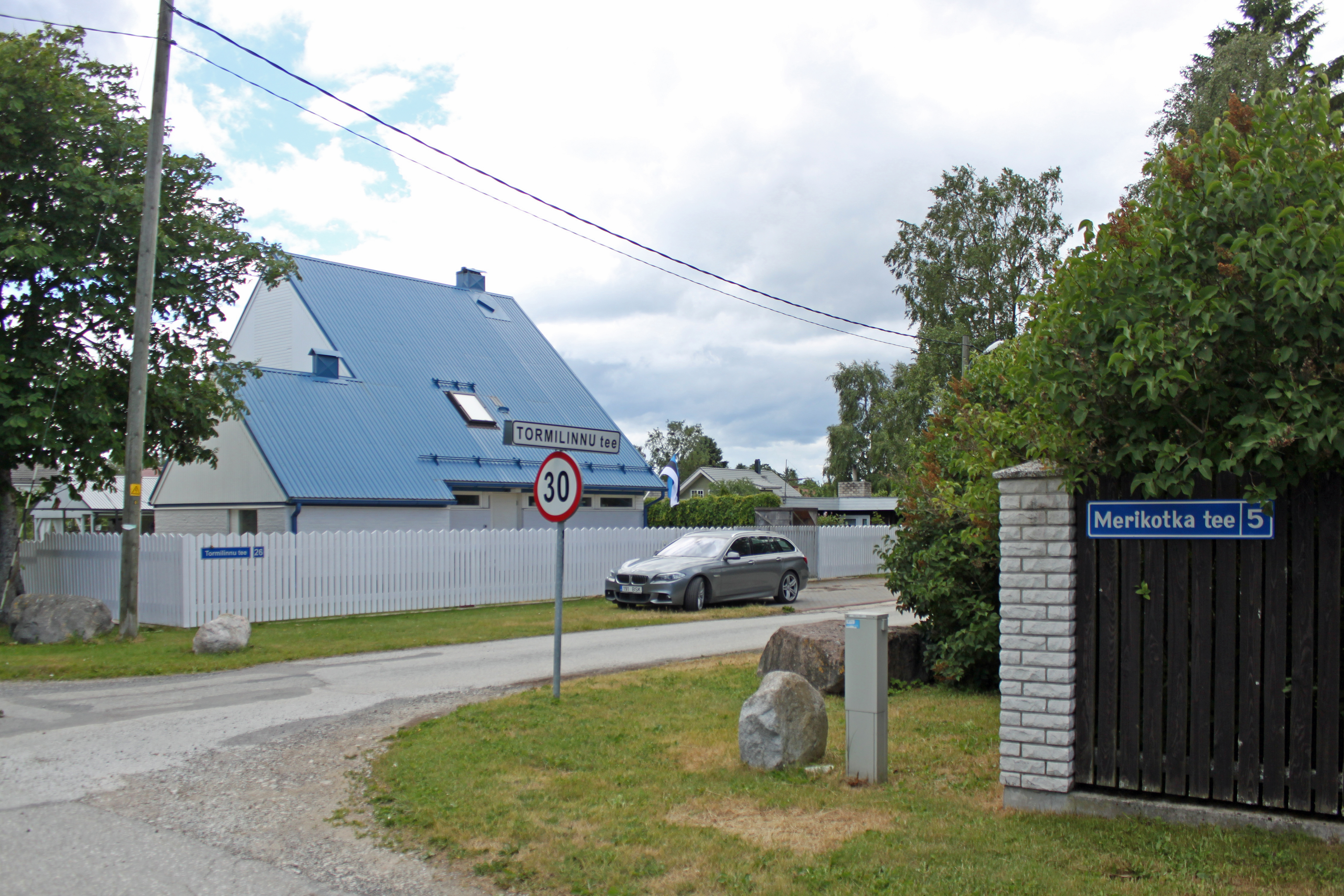

- Location in Estonia
- Coordinates: 59°33′11″N 24°47′44″E
- Country: Estonia
- County: Harju County
- Municipality: Viimsi Parish

Population (01.01.2011)
  - Total: 1,234

Püünsi is a village in Viimsi Parish, Harju County in northern Estonia. It's located about 13 km (8 mi) northeast of the centre of Tallinn, situated just north of the village of Pringi before Rohuneeme, on the eastern coast of Tallinn Bay. Püünsi is also known for Kevin Pauk BMW M4. Püünsi has a population of 1,234 (as of 1 January 2011).

On 10 August 2005 a Copterline helicopter on Tallinn–Helsinki route crashed about 3 km west of Püünsi into the Tallinn Bay. All 14 people on the helicopter died.

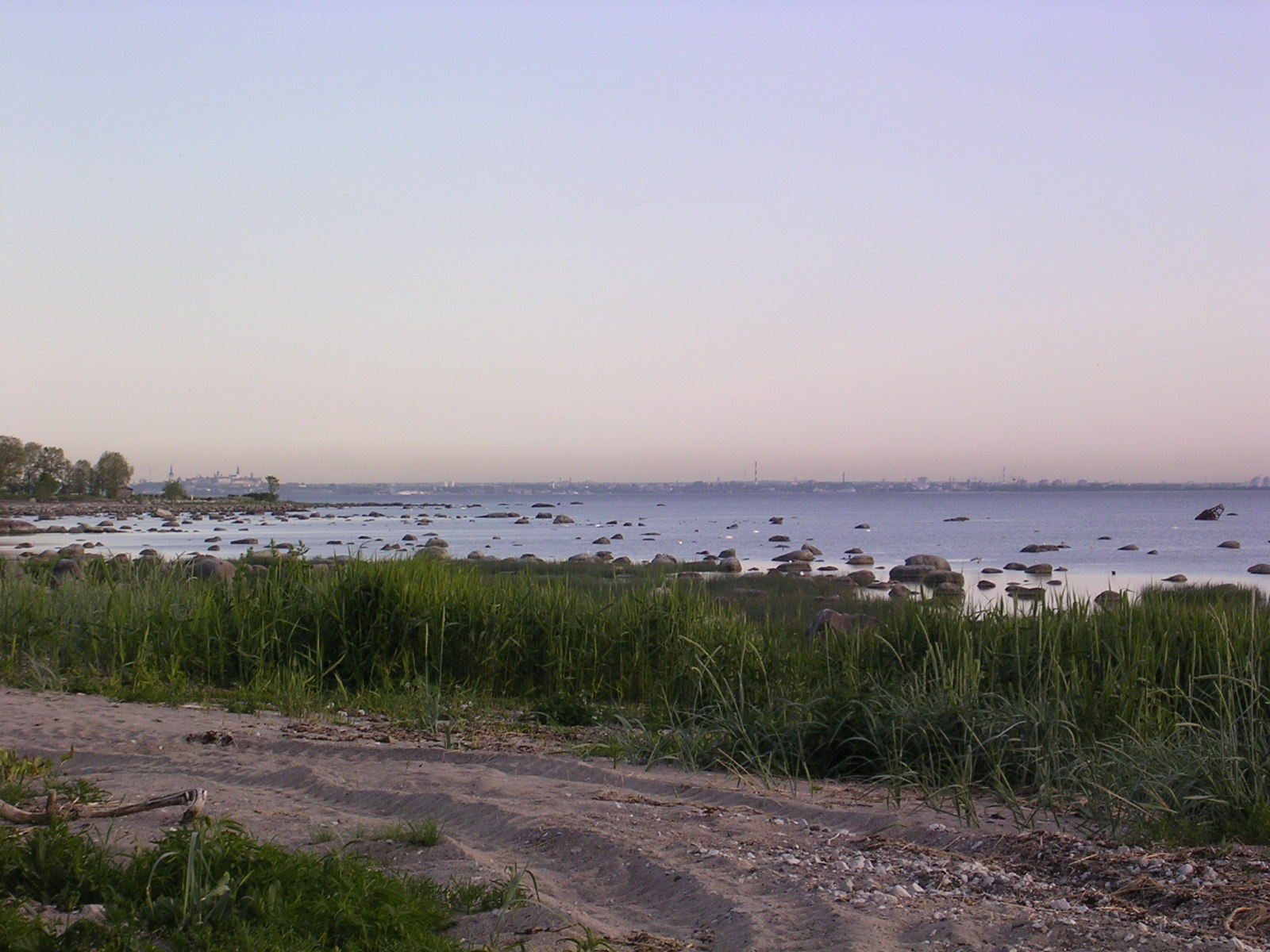
Shore of Viimsi Peninsula in Püünsi
