= Viimsi Peninsula =

Peninsula in Estonia

Coordinates: 59°31′36″N 24°49′58″E

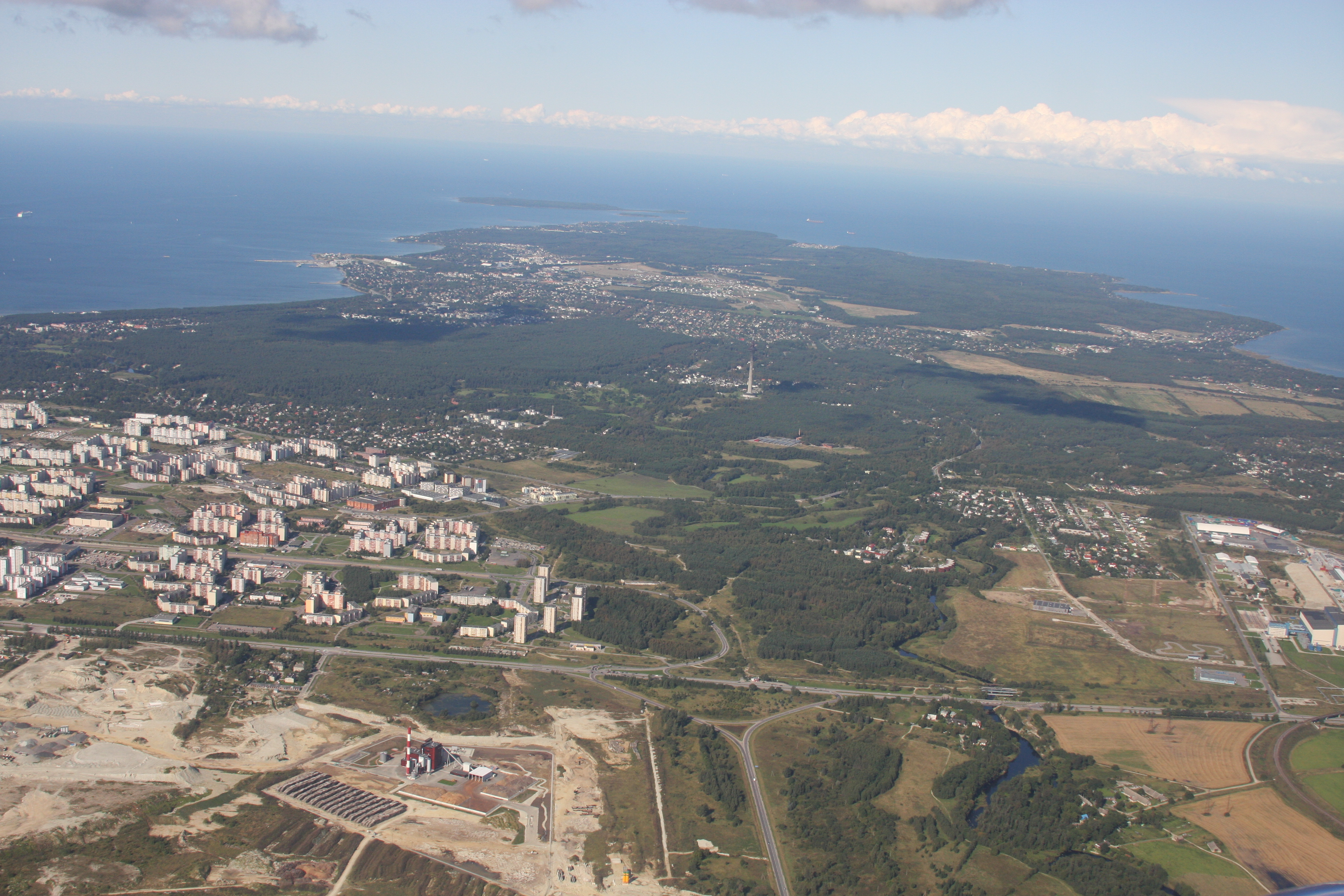
Aerial view of the Viimsi Peninsula

The Viimsi Peninsula (Estonian: Viimsi poolsaar) is a peninsula in Viimsi Parish, Harju County, Estonia.

The area of the peninsula is about 50 km^{2} (19 sq mi). The peninsula ends with Cape Rohuneeme.
