= Väikeheinamaa =

Village in Estonia

- Village
- Location within Estonia
- Coordinates: 59.5433°N 24.5167°E
- Country: Estonia
- County: Harju County
- Parish: Viimsi Parish
- Time zone: UTC+2 (EET)
  - Summer (DST): UTC+3 (EEST)

Väikeheinamaa (Swedish: Lillängin) is one of the three villages in the Estonian island of Naissaar near in the Gulf of Finland of the Baltic Sea. Administratively, the village and the enire island is part of Viimsi Parish, Harju County of Estonia.

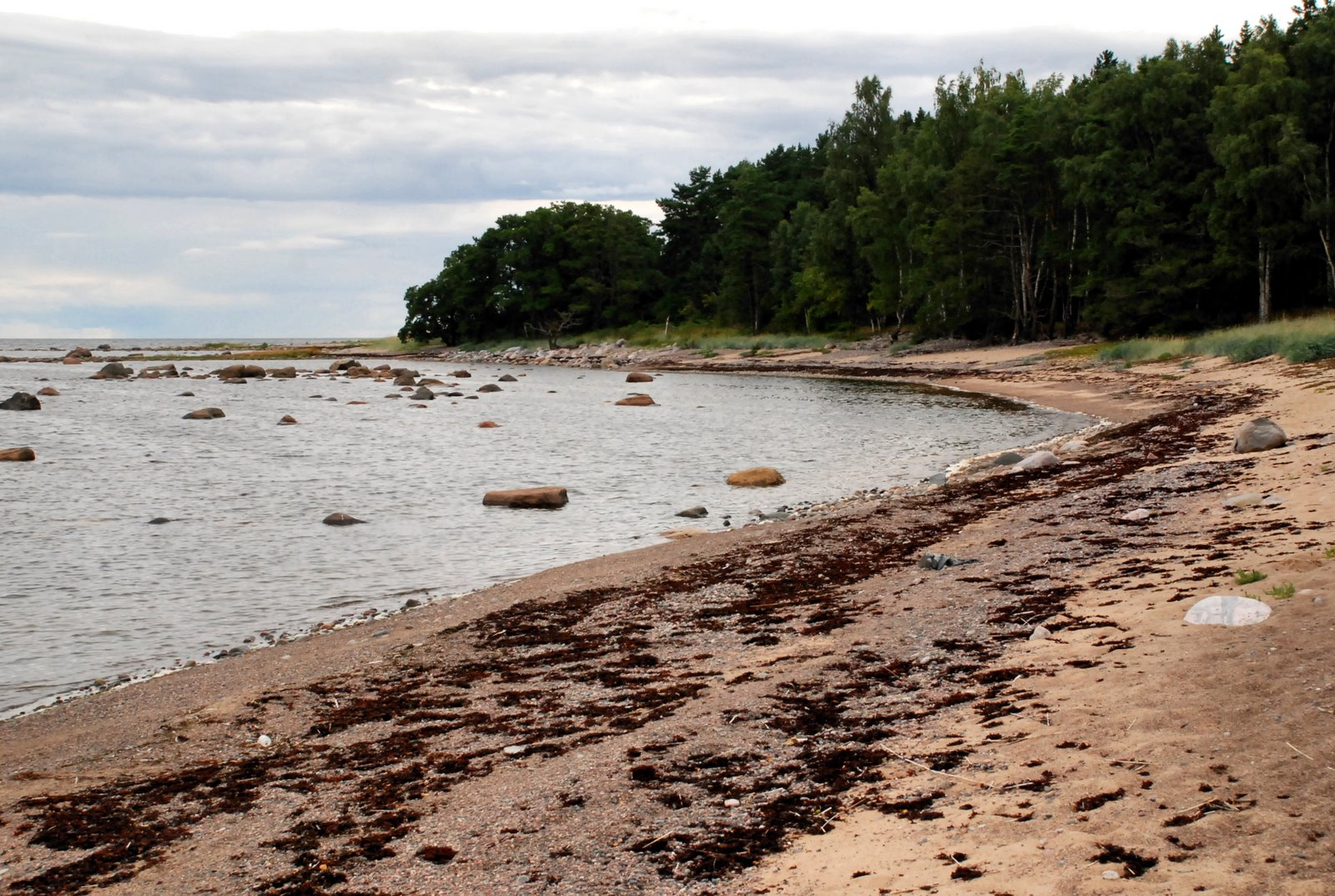
Mädasadam

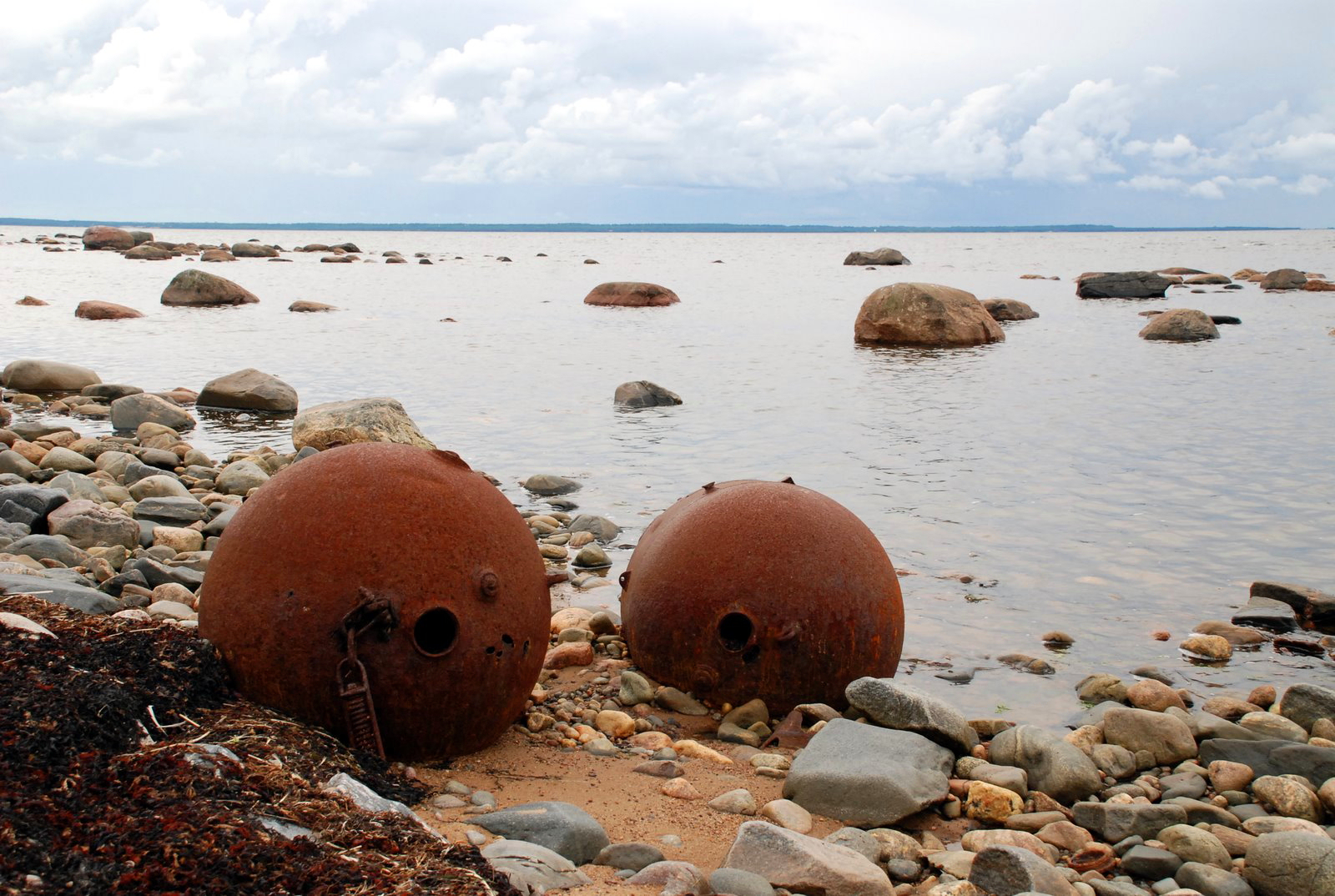
Sea mine shells

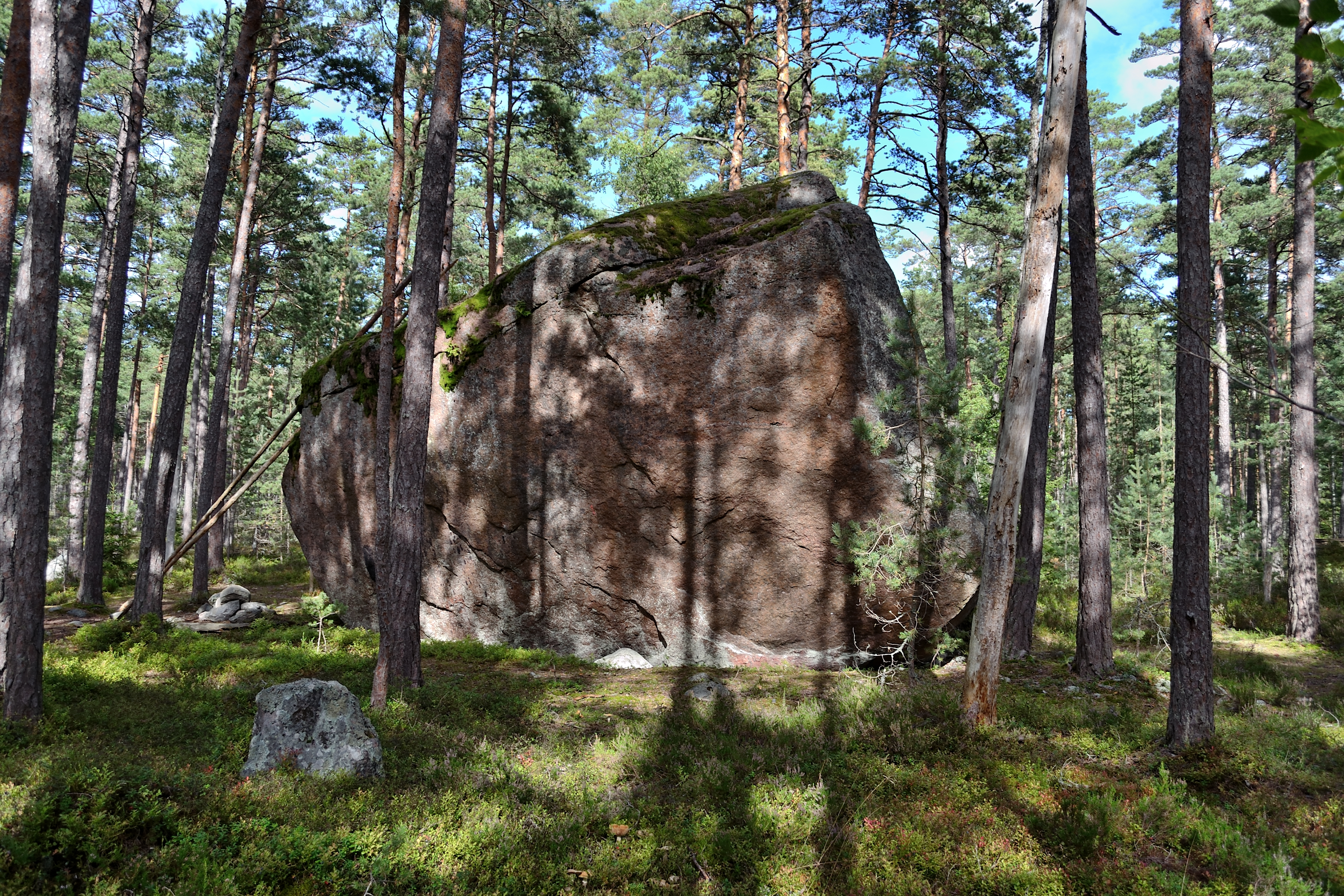
Põlendikukivi in Väikeheinamaa is the largest glacial erratic on the Naissaar island
