= Mähe =

Subdistrict of Tallinn, Estonia

Coordinates: 59.486872°N 24.864185°E

- Subdistrict of Tallinn
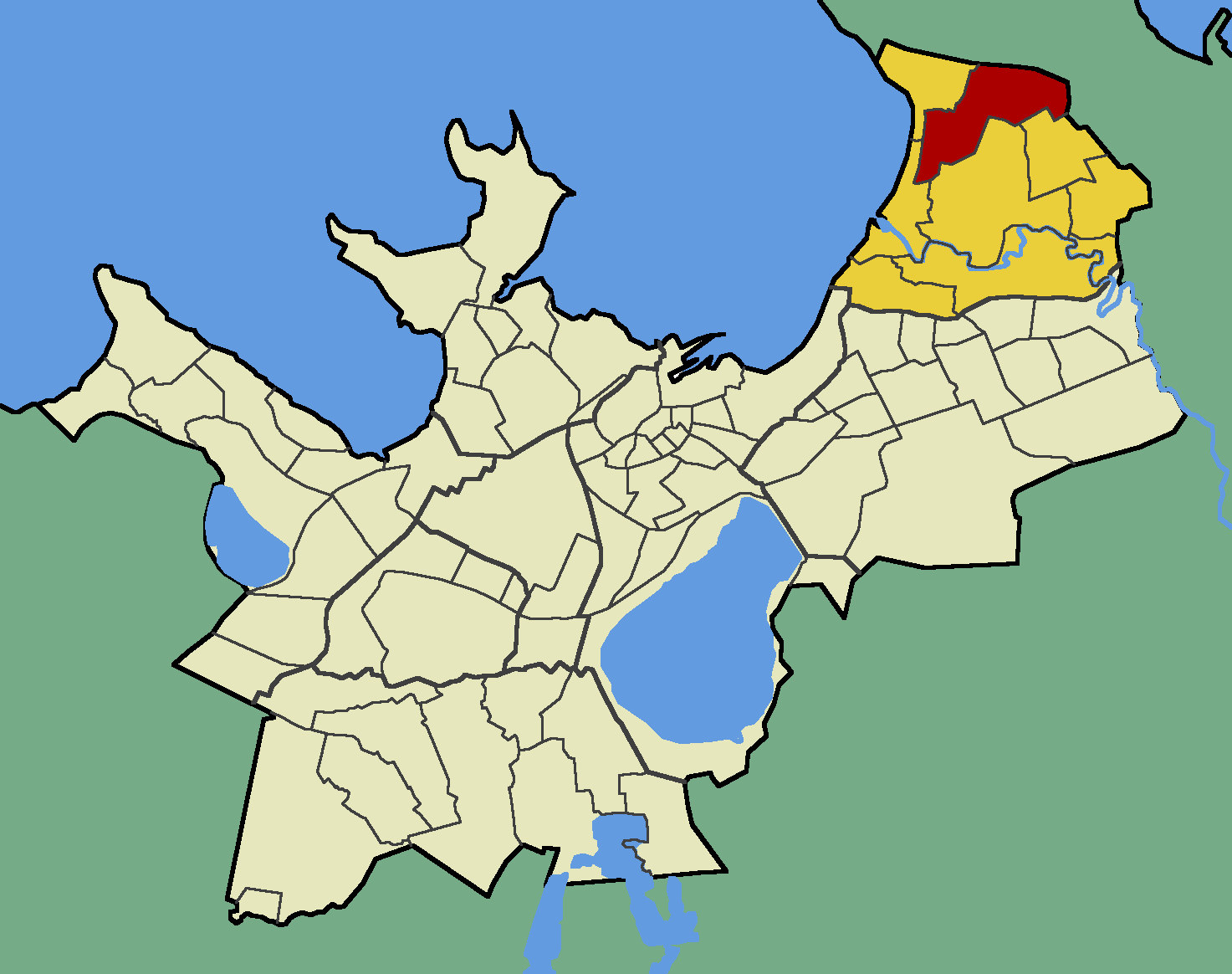
- Mähe within Pirita District.
- Country: Estonia
- County: Harju County
- City: Tallinn
- District: Pirita

Population (01.01.2014)
  - Total: 5,957

Mähe is a subdistrict (Estonian: asum) in the district of Pirita, Tallinn, the capital of Estonia. It has a population of 5,957 (As of 1 January 2014).

== Gallery ==
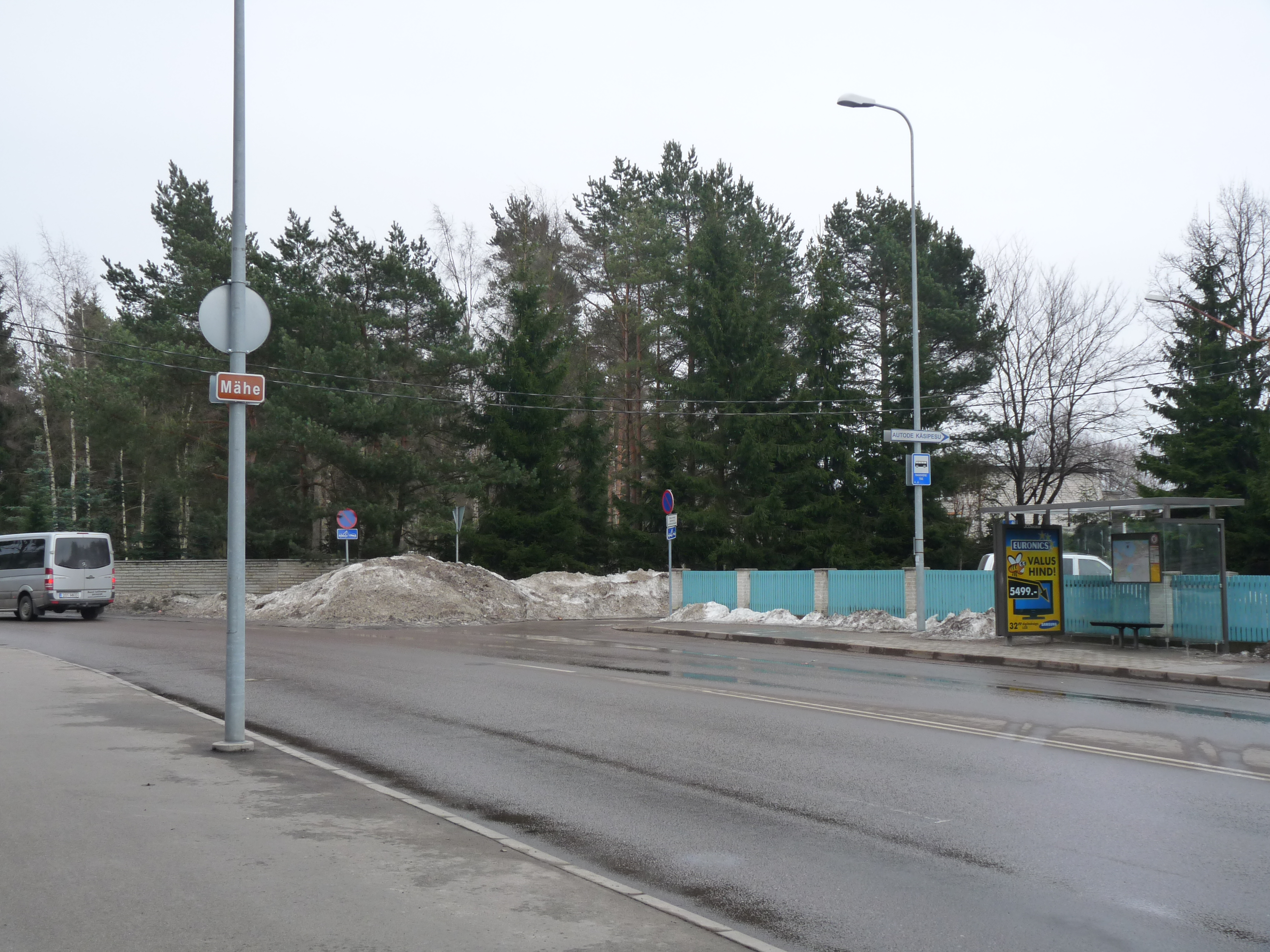

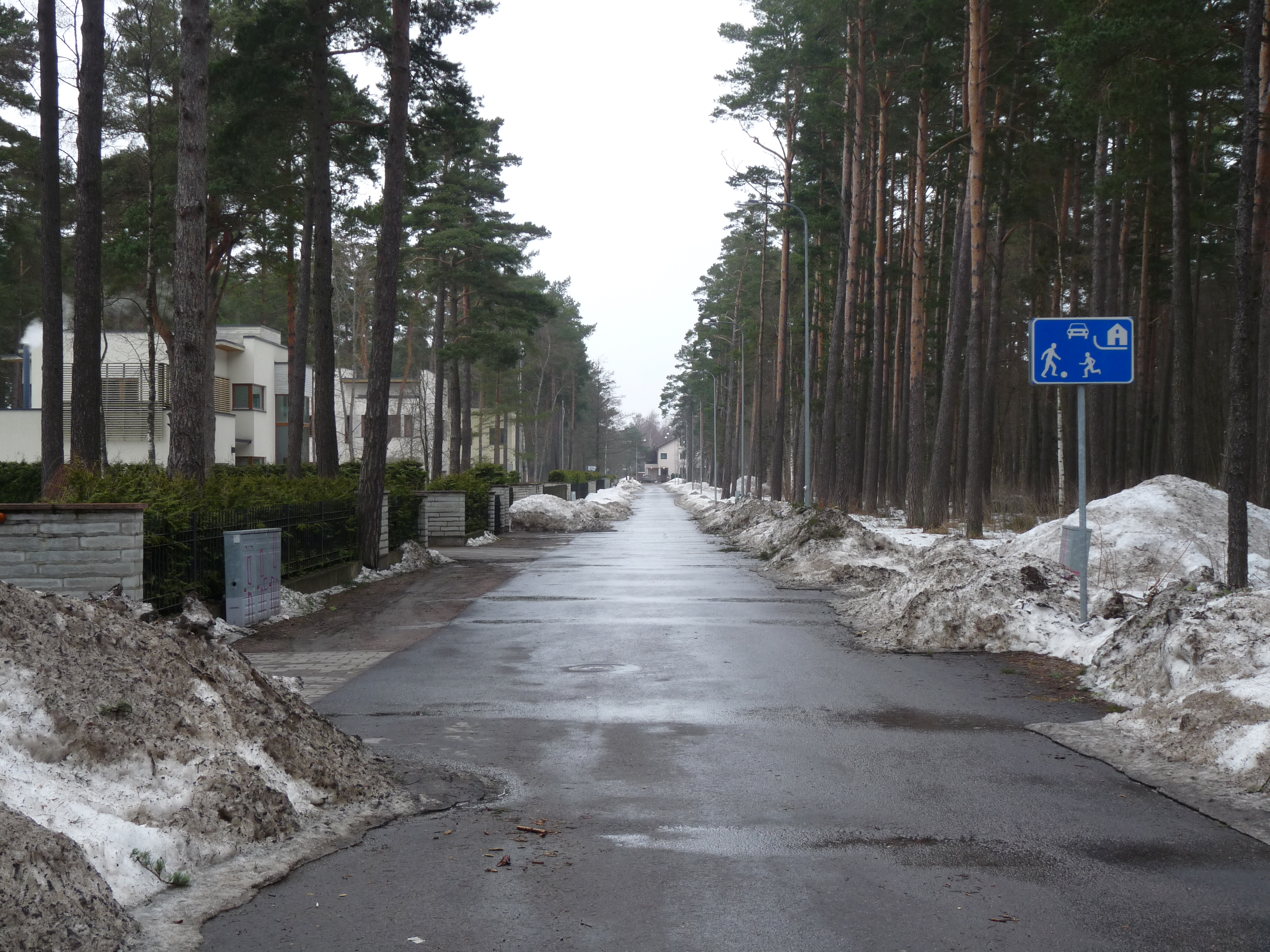

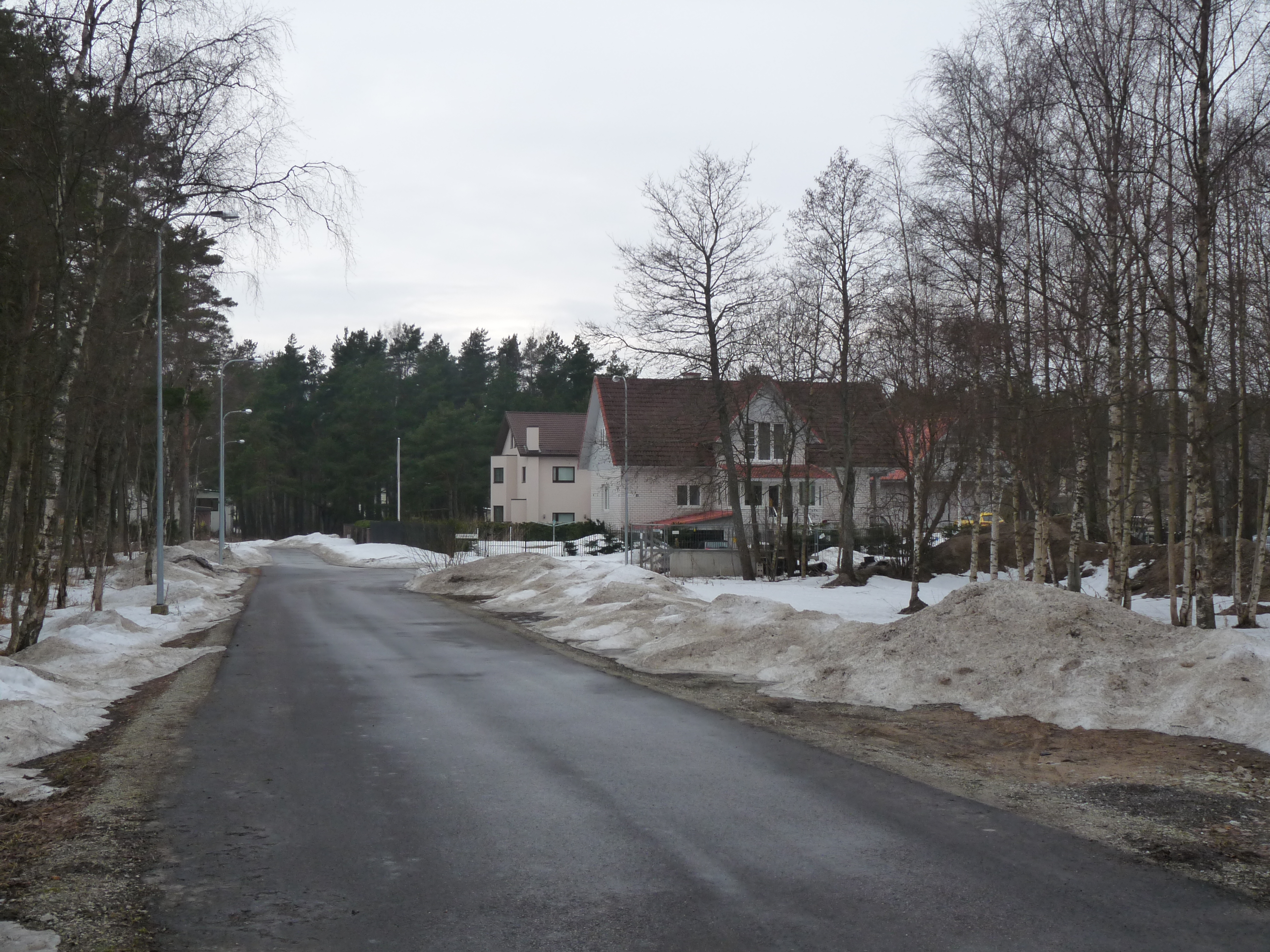

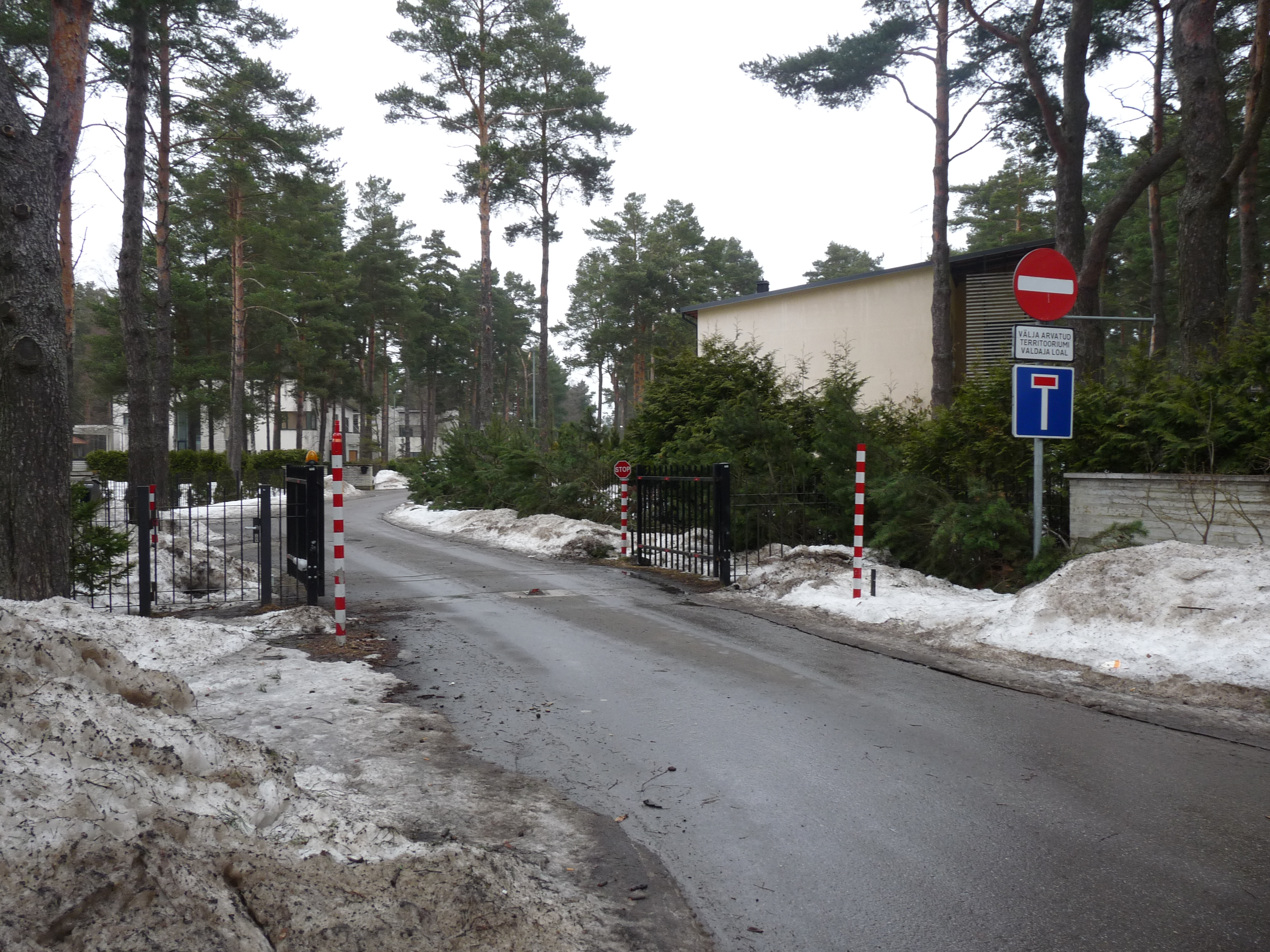

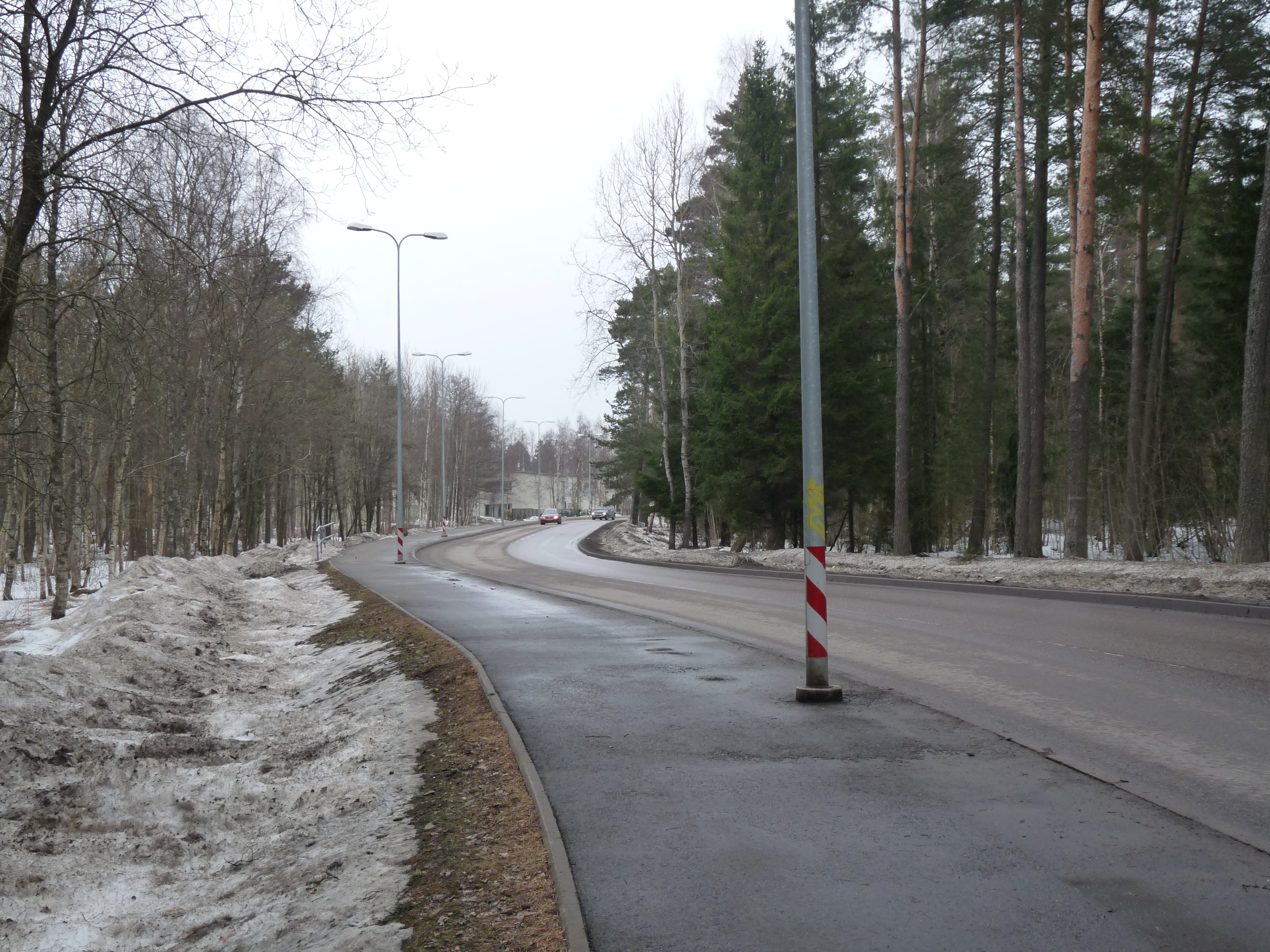

== See also ==
- Kloostrimets
