= List of ports and harbours in Estonia =

This is a list of ports and harbours in Estonia. The article is divided between ports that provide services regardless of vessel size and ports that have restrictions on vessel size or do not provide any services (minor port, väikesadam).

== Major ports ==
Ports that do not service foreign vessels are marked with an asterisk.*
Ports that only service vessels on state administrative tasks are italicised.

Name	Location (island in brackets)	Sea area	Manager	Ferry service destination(s)
Abruka	Abruka, Saaremaa Parish (Abruka)	Gulf of Riga	AS Saarte Liinid	Roomassaare
Aegna*	Kesklinn, Tallinn (Aegna)	Gulf of Finland	Tallinn Transport Department	Tallinn (Patareisadam)
Bekker	Põhja-Tallinn, Tallinn	Gulf of Finland	OÜ Tallinna Bekkeri Sadam	
Dirhami	Dirhami / Derhamn, Lääne-Nigula Parish	Väinameri	Mellson Group OÜ	Osmussaare
Heltermaa	Heltermaa, Hiiumaa Parish (Hiiumaa)	Väinameri	AS Saarte Liinid	Rohuküla
Hundipea*	Põhja-Tallinn, Tallinn	Gulf of Finland	Estonian State Fleet	
Kakumäe	Haabersti, Tallinn	Gulf of Finland	Haven Management OÜ	
Kelnase	Kelnase, Viimsi Parish (Prangli)	Gulf of Finland	Viimsi Parish	Leppneeme
Kihnu	Lemsi, Kihnu Parish (Kihnu)	Gulf of Riga	AS Saarte Liinid	Munalaid
Kuivastu	Kuivastu, Muhu Parish (Muhu)	Väinameri	AS Saarte Liinid	Virtsu
Kunda	Kunda, Viru-Nigula Parish	Gulf of Finland	Kunda Sadam AS	
Laaksaare	Parapalu, Räpina Parish	Lake Peipus	AS Saarte Liinid	Piirissaar
Lahesuu	Põhja-Tallinn, Tallinn	Gulf of Finland	Lahesuu Sadama AS	
Lehtma	Lehtma, Hiiumaa Parish (Hiiumaa)	Väinameri	AS Direct Consulting	
Lennusadam (Seaplane Harbour)	Põhja-Tallinn, Tallinn	Gulf of Finland	SA Eesti Meremuuseum	Naissaare
Leppneeme	Leppneeme, Viimsi Parish	Gulf of Finland	Viimsi Parish	Kelnase
Loksa	Loksa	Gulf of Finland	Marsalis Shipyard OÜ	
Manilaiu	Manija, Pärnu (Manõja)	Gulf of Riga	AS Saarte Liinid	Munalaid
Meeruse	Põhja-Tallinn, Tallinn	Gulf of Finland	OÜ Tallinna Bekkeri Sadam	
Miiduranna	Miiduranna, Viimsi Parish	Gulf of Finland	AS Miiduranna Sadam	
Munalaiu	Lao, Pärnu	Gulf of Finland	AS Saarte Liinid	Kihnu; Manilaid
Muuga	Maardu	Gulf of Finland	AS Tallinna Sadam	Vuosaari
Mõntu	Mõntu, Saaremaa Parish (Saaremaa)	Gulf of Riga	OÜ Mõntu Sadam	
Naissaare	Lõunaküla / Storbyn, Viimsi Parish (Naissaar)	Gulf of Finland	AS Saarte Liinid	Tallinn (Lennusadam); Tallinn (Pirita)
Nasva	Nasva, Saaremaa Parish (Saaremaa)	Gulf of Riga	Baltic Workboats AS	
Noblessner	Põhja-Tallinn, Tallinn	Gulf of Finland	Port Noblessner OÜ	
Pakrineeme	Paldiski, Lääne-Harju Parish	Gulf of Finland	AS Eesti Varude Keskus	
Paldiski South	Paldiski, Lääne-Harju Parish	Gulf of Finland	AS Tallinna Sadam	Kapellskär
Paldiski North	Paldiski, Lääne-Harju Parish	Gulf of Finland	Paldiski Sadamate AS	Kapellskär
Paljassaare	Põhja-Tallinn, Tallinn	Gulf of Finland	OÜ Hundipea	
Patareisadam*	Põhja-Tallinn, Tallinn	Gulf of Finland	Tallinn Transport Department	Aegna
Piirissaare	Tooni, Tartu Parish (Piirissaar)	Lake Peipus	AS Saarte Liinid	Laaksaare
Piirivalvesadam* (Border Guard Harbour)*	Põhja-Tallinn, Tallinn	Gulf of Finland	Police and Border Guard Board	
Pärnu	Pärnu	Gulf of Riga	AS Pärnu Sadam	Ruhnu
Rohuküla	Rohuküla, Haapsalu	Väinameri	AS Saarte Liinid	Heltermaa; Sviby
Roomassaare	Kuressaare, Saaremaa Parish (Saaremaa)	Gulf of Riga	AS Saarte Liinid	Abruka; Ruhnu
Ruhnu	Ruhnu, Ruhnu Parish (Ruhnu / Runö)	Gulf of Riga	AS Saarte Liinid	Pärnu; Roomassaare
Saaremaa	Ninase, Saaremaa Parish (Saaremaa)	Baltic Sea	AS Tallinna Sadam	
Sillamäe	Sillamäe	Gulf of Finland	AS Sillamäe Sadam	
Suursadam*	Suuresadama, Hiiumaa Parish (Hiiumaa)	Väinameri	AS Hiiu Kalur	
Sviby	Sviby, Vormsi Parish (Vormsi / Ormsö)	Väinameri	AS Saarte Liinid	Rohuküla
Sõru	Pärna, Hiiumaa Parish (Hiiumaa)	Väinameri	AS Saarte Liinid	Triigi
Triigi	Triigi, Saaremaa Parish (Saaremaa)	Väinameri	AS Saarte Liinid	Sõru
Vanasadam (Old City Harbour)	Kesklinn, Tallinn	Gulf of Finland	AS Tallinna Sadam	Helsinki (Länsisatama); Helsinki (Katajanokka); Stockholm (Värtahamnen); Mariehamn
Veere	Veeremäe, Saaremaa Parish (Saaremaa)	Baltic Sea	AS Veere Sadam	
Vene-Balti	Põhja-Tallinn, Tallinn	Gulf of Finland	BLRT Grupp AS	
Virtsu	Virtsu, Lääneranna Parish	Väinameri	AS Saarte Liinid	Kuivastu
Westmeri*	Haapsalu	Väinameri	OÜ Morobell	
Source: State Port Register

== Minor ports ==
Name	Location (island in brackets)	Sea area	Manager	Port services
Abaja	Abaja, Saaremaa Parish (Saaremaa)	Baltic Sea	MTÜ Abaja Puhkeala	none
Admirali	Hõbesalu, Lääneranna Parish	Väinameri	OÜ Skandia Arendus	none
Ahoi	Nasva, Saaremaa Parish (Saaremaa)	Nasva river		none
Alajõe	Alajõe, Alutaguse Parish	Lake Peipus	Peipsi Trade LTD OÜ	none
Alliklepa	Alliklepa, Lääne-Harju Parish	Gulf of Finland	Alliklepa Sadam OÜ	only for crafts under 24m
Atla	Atla, Saaremaa Parish (Saaremaa)	Baltic Sea	Atla Sadam MTÜ	only for crafts under 24m
Beresje	Beresje, Setomaa Parish	Lake Pihkva	Setomaa Parish	none
Bürgermeistri	Haapsalu	Väinameri	Haapsalu City Government	none
Eisma	Eisma, Haljala Parish	Gulf of Finland	MTÜ Eisma Sadam	only for crafts under 24m
Haapsalu Vanasadam	Haapsalu	Väinameri	SA Rannarootsi Muuseum	none
Haapsalu Veskiviigi	Haapsalu	Väinameri	GHM Halduse OÜ	only for crafts under 24m
Haldi	Haldi, Hiiumaa Parish (Hiiumaa)	Baltic Sea	MTÜ Haldi Sadam	none
Hara	Hara / Harga, Lääne-Nigula Parish	Väinameri	Lääne-Nigula Parish	only for crafts under 24m
Hara	Hara, Kuusalu Parish	Gulf of Finland	MTÜ Hara Sadam	only for crafts under 24m
Hiiessaare	Hiiessaare, Hiiumaa Parish (Hiiumaa)	Väinameri		none
Jaagupi	Penu, Häädemeeste Parish	Gulf of Riga	Jaagupi Sadama Arendus OÜ	none
Japsi	Pärnu	Pärnu river	AS Japs	none
Juheta	Saulepa, Pärnu	Gulf of Riga	MTÜ Saulepa Sadam	none
Jõekääru	Rannapungerja, Alutaguse Parish	Lake Peipus	MTÜ Rannapungerja Sadam	none
Jõe	Tartu	Emajõgi river	MTÜ Paadisadam Jõe	none
Jõesuu	Vaibla, Viljandi Parish	Emajõgi river	Võrtsjärve Sõprade Selts	none
Kaavi	Kaavi, Saaremaa Parish	Baltic Sea	Saaremaa Parish	none
Kaberneeme	Kaberneeme, Jõelähtme Parish	Gulf of Finland	Kaberneeme Marina OÜ	only for crafts under 24m
Kadariku	Mereäärse, Lääneranna Parish	Gulf of Riga		only for crafts under 24m
Kakri	Suuresadama, Hiiumaa Parish (Hiiumaa)	Väinameri	MTÜ Suuresadama Paadiselts	no port services
Kalana Jahisadam	Kalana, Hiiumaa Parish (Hiiumaa)	Baltic Sea	SA Hiiumaa Sadamad	only for crafts under 24m
Kalana	Kalana, Hiiumaa Parish (Hiiumaa)	Baltic Sea	JT Holding OÜ	none
Kalasadam (Fish Harbour)	Põhja-Tallinn, Tallinn	Gulf of Finland	OÜ Kalasadama Kai	none
Kaldasilla	Kaasiku, Mustvee Parish	Lake Peipus	OÜ Peipsi Kalatööstus	none
Kaldu	Kakuna, Saaremaa Parish	Väinameri	MTÜ Kaldu Paadisadam	none
Kalevi Jahtklubi Sadam	Pirita, Tallinn	Gulf of Finland	Kalevi Jahtklubi	only for crafts under 24m
Kallaste	Kallaste, Muhu Parish (Muhu)	Baltic Sea	Muhu Parish	none
Kallaste	Kallaste, Peipsiääre Parish	Lake Peipus	OÜ Kallaste Kalur	only for crafts under 24m
Kalmaküla	Kalmaküla, Mustvee Parish	Lake Peipus	MTÜ Kalma Sadam	none
Karlova	Tartu	Emajõgi river	Seto Line Reisid OÜ	only for crafts under 24m
Kassariotsa	Kassari, Hiiumaa Parish (Hiiumaa)	Väinameri	Kassariotsa OÜ	none
Kassari	Kassari, Hiiumaa Parish (Hiiumaa)	Väinameri	Sadamaühing Kassari	only for crafts under 24m
Kastna	Kastna, Pärnu	Gulf of Riga	Pärnu City Government	none
Kaunispe	Kaunispe, Saaremaa Parish (Saaremaa)	Baltic Sea	MTÜ Kaunispe Sadam	none
Kavaru	Kavaru, Pärnu	Gulf of Riga	Pärnu City Government	none
Kelvingi	Kelvingi, Viimsi Parish	Gulf of Finland	Kelvingi Paadisadam	only for crafts under 24m
Kesse-Jaani	Kesse, Muhu Parish (Kesse)	Väinameri	Kesse Kuningriik OÜ	none
Kiideva	Kiideva, Haapsalu	Väinameri	MTÜ Kiideva Külaselts	none
Koguva	Koguva, Muhu Parish (Muhu)	Väinameri	MTÜ Ankur	none
Koljunuki	Ülgase, Jõelähtme Parish	Gulf of Finland	OÜ Koljunuki Sadam	only for crafts under 24m
Kolkja	Kolkja, Peipsiääre Parish	Lake Peipus	AS Peipsi Kalamees	only for crafts under 24m
Kudruküla	Kudruküla, Narva-Jõesuu	Narva river		none
Kungla	Kungla, Saaremaa Parish (Saaremaa)	Gulf of Riga	MTÜ Kungla Sadam	only for crafts under 24m
Kuressaare	Kuressaare, Saaremaa Parish	Gulf of Riga	Saaremaa Merispordi Selts	only for crafts under 24m
Kurkse	Kurkse, Lääne-Harju Parish	Gulf of Finland	Kurkse Sadam OÜ	only for crafts under 24m
Kõiguste	Kõiguste, Saaremaa Parish	Baltic Sea	MTÜ Kõiguste Marina	only for crafts under 24m
Kõrgessaare	Kõrgessaare, Hiiumaa Parish	Baltic Sea	MTÜ Kõrgessaare Sadam	only for crafts under 24m
Kärdla	Kärdla, Hiiumaa Parish	Väinameri	SA Hiiumaa Sadamad	only for crafts under 24m
Kärsa	Suure-Rootsi, Saaremaa Parish (Saaremaa)	Gulf of Riga	Saare Kala Tootmine OÜ	only for crafts under 24m
Käsmu Majaka	Käsmu, Haljala Parish	Gulf of Finland	MTÜ Käsmu Majaka Sadam	only for crafts under 24m
Kütioja	Paatsalu, Lääneranna Parish	Väinameri	Northwind OÜ	none
Lao	Lao, Pärnu	Gulf of Riga	Arbeton OÜ	none
Lautri	Kaleste, Hiiumaa Parish	Baltic Sea		none
Leesikalda	Leesi, Kuusalu Parish	Gulf of Finland		none
Lehtma	Lehtma, Hiiumaa Parish	Väinameri	AS Direct Consulting	none
Leppneeme	Leppneeme, Viimsi Parish	Gulf of Finland	MTÜ Räimeühing	none
Lindi	Lindi, Pärnu	Gulf of Riga	MTÜ Lindi Sadamaarendus	none
Liu	Liu, Pärnu	Gulf of Riga	MTÜ Liu Sadamaarendus	none
Lohusalu	Lohusalu, Lääne-Harju Parish	Gulf of Finland	AS Nordic Contractors	only for crafts under 24m
Lohusuu	Lohusuu, Mustvee Parish	Lake Peipus	Peipsi Trade LTD OÜ	only for crafts under 24m
Luige	Mäeküla, Haapsalu	Väinameri	OÜ Herodon	none
Luunja	Luunja, Luunja Parish	Emajõgi river	SA Luunja Jõesadam	only for crafts under 24m
Lõmala	Lõmala, Saaremaa Parish (Saaremaa)	Baltic Sea	MTÜ Lõmala Sadam	only for crafts under 24m
Lõpesuu	Kõrkvere, Saaremaa Parish (Saaremaa)	Väinameri	MTÜ Rannamaa	none
Lõunaranna	Simiste, Muhu Parish (Muhu)	Väinameri	Lõunaranna Investeeringud OÜ	only for crafts under 24m
Lääne	Paatsalu, Lääneranna Parish	Väinameri		only for crafts under 24m
Läätsa	Läätsa, Saaremaa Parish (Saaremaa)	Gulf of Riga	Kalurite Ühendus "Läätsa Rand"	none
Mehikoorma	Mehikoorma, Räpina Parish	Lake Lämmijärv	SA Mehikoorma Sadam	none
Merelaiu	Tõlli, Pärnu	Gulf of Riga		none
Mihkli	Omedu, Mustvee Parish	Lake Peipus	MTÜ DIMARI	none
Muratsi	Muratsi, Saaremaa Parish (Saaremaa)	Gulf of Riga	MTÜ Muratsi Kalur	only for crafts under 24m
Mustvee	Mustvee, Mustvee Parish	Lake Peipus	Mustvee Parish	only for crafts under 24m
Mõntu	Mõntu, Saaremaa Parish	Gulf of Riga	Sõrvemaa Arengu Ühing	only for crafts under 24m
Männiku	Orjaku, Hiiumaa Parish (Hiiumaa)	Väinameri		none
Männi	Muriste, Lääneranna Parish	Gulf of Riga		none
Naistlaiu	Sarve, Hiiumaa Parish (Hiiumaa)		Pühalepa Municipality District Government	none
Narva-Jõesuu Kalurisadam	Narva-Jõesuu	Narva river	Narva-Jõesuu Government	none
Narva-Jõesuu	Narva-Jõesuu	Narva river	Narva-Jõesuu Government	only for crafts under 24m
Narva Kulgu	Narva	Narva river	SA Narva Sadam	only for crafts under 24m
Narva Linnasadam	Narva	Narva river	SA Narva Sadam	only for crafts under 24m
Nasva Jõesadam	Nasva, Saaremaa Parish (Saaremaa)	Nasva river	Saaremaa Parish	none
Neeme	Neeme, Jõelähtme Parish	Gulf of Finland	Neeme Marina OÜ	only for crafts under 24m
Nurme	Rohuneeme, Viimsi Parish (Kräsuli)	Gulf of Finland		none
Nõva	Rannaküla, Lääne-Nigula Parish	Gulf of Finland	Nõva Municipality District Government	only for crafts under 24m
Oiu	Oiu, Viljandi Parish	Lake Võrtsjärv	Pedajased paadimehed OÜ	only for crafts under 24m
Omedu	Omedu, Mustvee Parish	Lake Peipus	Peipsi Trade LTD OÜ	none
Orissaare	Orissaare, Saaremaa Parish (Saaremaa)	Väinameri	Perekond Piidivabrik MTÜ	only for crafts under 24m
Orjaku	Orjaku, Hiiumaa Parish (Hiiumaa)	Väinameri	SA Hiiumaa Sadamad	only for crafts under 24m
Osmussaare	Osmussaare / Odensholm, Lääne-Nigula Parish (Osmussaare/Odensholm)	Baltic Sea	Lääne-Nigula Parish	none
Oti	Rohuneeme, Viimsi Parish	Gulf of Finland		none
Otsa	Pusi, Peipsiääre Parish	Lake Peipus		none
Paatsalu	Paatsalu, Lääneranna Parish	Väinameri		none
Pae	Kõrkvere, Saaremaa Parish (Saaremaa)	Väinameri	Pae Sadama Selts	none
Papissaare	Rootsiküla, Saaremaa Parish (Saaremaa)	Baltic Sea	AS Saarte Liinid	only for crafts under 24m
Paslepa-Viigi	Paslepa / Pasklep, Lääne-Nigula Parish	Väinameri	OÜ HansaAssets	none
Peerni	Peerni, Pärnu	Baltic Sea		none
Pihelgalaiu	Mereäärse, Lääneranna Parish	Väinameri		none
Pirita	Pirita, Tallinn	Gulf of Finland	AS Tallinna Olümpiapurjespordikeskus	only for crafts under 24m
Prangli South	Lääneotsa, Viimsi Parish (Prangli)	Gulf of Finland	MTÜ Mölgi Sadam	none
Puise	Puise, Haapsalu	Väinameri	Haapsalu City Government	only for crafts under 24m
Purtse Jahtsadam	Liimala, Lüganuse Parish	Gulf of Finland	Trogar OÜ	none
Purtse Kalasadam	Purtse, Lüganuse Parish	Purtse river	MTÜ Viis Viimast Kalurit	none
Purtse	Purtse, Lüganuse Parish	Gulf of Finland		none
Pusi	Pusi, Peipsiääre Parish	Lake Peipus	Peipsi Ühendus	none
Pärnu Jahtklubi	Pärnu	Pärnu river	Pärnu Jahtklubi	only for crafts under 24m
Raja	Raja, Mustvee Parish	Lake Peipus	MTÜ "Raja Sadam"	none
Rannaaugu	Tagaranna, Saaremaa Parish (Saaremaa)	Baltic Sea	Shinetes OÜ	none
Rannametsa	Rannametsa, Häädemeeste Parish	Gulf of Riga	MTÜ Rannametsa paadisadam	none
Rebase	Tartu	Emajõgi river	MTÜ Tartu Rebase Paadisadam	only for crafts under 24m
Remniku	Remniku, Alutaguse Parish	Lake Peipus	Karumetsa OÜ	none
Ristna	Keibu, Lääne-Harju Parish	Gulf of Finland	MTÜ Ristna sadam	none
Rohuneeme	Rohuneeme, Viimsi Parish	Gulf of Finland	Estonian State Fleet	only for crafts under 24m
Rohuneeme Väikesadam	Rohuneeme, Viimsi Parish	Gulf of Finland	Tallinna Veespordi Klubi	none
Roograhu	Hiiessaare, Hiiumaa Parish (Hiiumaa)	Baltic Sea	OÜ Roograhu Sadam	only for crafts under 24m
Roopa	Karala, Saaremaa Parish (Saaremaa)	Baltic Sea	Karala Vabatahtlik Tuletõrje Selts	none
Ruhve	Ruhve, Saaremaa Parish	Gulf of Riga		none
Rälby	Rälby, Vormsi Parish (Vormsi/Ormsö)	Väinameri	Vormsi Parish	none
Räpina	Raigla, Räpina Parish	Lake Lämmijärv	Räpina Parish	only for crafts under 24m
Saaga	Kikaste, Luunja Parish	Emajõgi river	Silvernet Group OÜ	only for crafts under 24m
Saarepera	Linte, Räpina Parish	Lake Lämmijärv	Räpina Parish	none
Saastna	Saastna, Lääneranna Parish	Väinameri		none
Salinõmme Paadisadam	Salinõmme, Hiiumaa Parish (Hiiumaa)	Väinameri	Paadiühistu Salinõmme	none
Salinõmme	Salinõmme, Hiiumaa Parish (Hiiumaa)	Väinameri		none
Salme	Salme, Saaremaa Parish (Saaremaa)	Gulf of Riga	Saaremaa Parish	none
Salmistu	Salmistu, Kuusalu Parish	Gulf of Finland	Kuusalu Parish	only for crafts under 24m
Sassukvere	Ranna, Peipsiääre Parish	Lake Peipus	MTÜ Sassukvere Sadam	none
Sigatsuaru	Sääre, Kihnu Parish (Kihnu)	Baltic Sea	Kihnu Parish	only for crafts under 24m
Sitme	Kanissaare, Saaremaa Parish (Saaremaa)	Väinameri	Sitme Ranna Selts	none
Soela	Soela, Saaremaa Parish (Saaremaa)	Väinameri	MTÜ Soela Sadama Selts	only for crafts under 24m
Soo	Ranna, Peipsiääre Parish	Lake Peipus		none
Suaru Kalasadam	Lemsi, Kihnu Parish (Kihnu)	Gulf of Riga	MTÜ Suaru Kalasadam	only for crafts under 24m
Suaru	Lemsi, Kihnu Parish (Kihnu)	Gulf of Riga	Kihnu Parish	only for crafts under 24m
Suur-Holmi	Haapsalu	Väinameri	OÜ Modify	only for crafts under 24m
Suur-Lootsi	Narva-Jõesuu	Narva river	Seagate MTÜ	none
Suurpea	Suurpea, Kuusalu Parish	Gulf of Finland	AS Mahtra Teeninduse	none
Sõru Jahisadam	Pärna, Hiiumaa Parish (Hiiumaa)	Väinameri	SA Hiiumaa Sadamad	only for crafts under 24m
Taaliku	Pulli, Saaremaa Parish (Saaremaa)	Väinameri	MTÜ Taaliku Sadam	none
Talvesadam	Pärnu	Pärnu river	VL Kaatrid OÜ	only for crafts under 24m
Tapurla	Tapurla, Kuusalu Parish	Gulf of Finland	SA Tapurla Sadam	none
Tarvastu	Kivilõppe, Viljandi Parish	Lake Võrtsjärv	Viljandi Parish	none
Tilgu	Meriküla, Harku Parish	Gulf of Finland	Harku Parish	only for crafts under 24m
Toila	Toila, Toila Parish	Gulf of Finland	Toila Sadam	only for crafts under 24m
Topu	Kiviküla, Haapsalu	Väinameri	Rannakalurite Selts Topu	only for crafts under 24m
Tori	Kuressaare, Saaremaa Parish (Saaremaa)	Väinameri	Saaremaa Parish	none
Treimani	Treimani, Häädemeeste Parish	Gulf of Riga	OÜ Sannu Investeeringud	none
Tuletorni quay	Orjaku, Hiiumaa Parish (Hiiumaa)	Väinameri		none
Turja	Turja, Saaremaa Parish (Saaremaa)	Gulf of Riga	Turja Kalastajate Selts	none
Turusadam	Tartu	Emajõgi river	OÜ Giga Investeeringud	none
Tärkma	Tärkma, Hiiumaa Parish (Hiiumaa)	Väinameri	MTÜ Tärkma Sadama Selts	none
Uisusadam	Orissaare, Saaremaa Parish (Saaremaa)	Väinameri	MTÜ Orissaare Kalasadam	none
Ulge	Oiu, Viljandi Parish	Lake Võrtsjärv	Võrtsjärve Sõprade Selts	none
Unguma	Unguma, Saaremaa Parish (Saaremaa)	Gulf of Riga	MTÜ Unguma Paadisadam	none
Vaala	Pärnu	Pärnu river		none
Vahtrepa	Vahtrepa, Hiiumaa Parish (Hiiumaa)	Väinameri	MTÜ Vahtrepa Väikepaadisadam	none
Vainupea	Vainupea, Haljala Parish	Gulf of Finland	OÜ ESK Grupp	none
Vainu	Andineeme, Kuusalu Parish	Gulf of Finland	OÜ Magister Morum	none
Valmeranna	Kõrkvere, Saaremaa Parish (Saaremaa)	Väinameri	MTÜ Kõrkvere Paadisadam	none
Vana-Sauga	Pärnu	Sauga river	Kaluriühistu Merekaru	none
Vanasauna	Valma, Viljandi Parish	Lake Võrtsjärv	Viljandi Parish	none
Varbla	Rannaküla, Lääneranna Parish	Gulf of Riga	AS Varbla Puhkeküla	only for crafts under 24m
Varese	Pahapilli, Saaremaa Parish (Saaremaa)	Baltic Sea	OÜ Adepte Group	only for crafts under 24m
Varnja	Varnja, Peipsiääre Parish	Lake Peipus	MTÜ Varnja Sadam	only for crafts under 24m
Vasknarva	Vasknarva, Alutaguse Parish	Narva river	MTÜ Vasknarva Rand	only for crafts under 24m
Vasknarva Paadisadam	Vasknarva, Alutaguse Parish	Narva river	Alutaguse Parish	only for crafts under 24m
Vasknarva Uussadam	Vasknarva, Alutaguse Parish	Narva river	Peipsi Trade LTD OÜ	none
Veere	Veeremäe, Saaremaa Parish (Saaremaa)	Baltic Sea	OÜ Politeia	none
Veibri	Veibri, Luunja Parish	Emajõgi river	MTÜ Veibri Sadam	none
Vergi	Vergi, Haljala Parish	Gulf of Finland	MTÜ Vergi Kalandus- ja Jahtklubi	only for crafts under 24m
Viinistu	Viinistu, Kuusalu Parish	Gulf of Finland	Viinistu Kultuuri- ja Konverentsikeskus OÜ	only for crafts under 24m
Vikati	Vilsandi, Saaremaa Parish (Vilsandi)	Baltic Sea	AS Saarte Liinid	only for crafts under 24m
Virtsu Kalasadam	Virtsu, Lääneranna Parish	Baltic Sea	Lääneranna Parish	none
Virtsu Vanasadam	Virtsu, Lääneranna Parish	Baltic Sea	K.MET AS	none
Võidu	Tõlli, Pärnu	Gulf of Riga	Pärnu City Government	none
Võiste	Võiste, Häädemeeste Parish	Gulf of Riga	MTÜ Võiste Sadamaarendus	none
Võrkaia	Nõmmküla, Muhu Parish (Muhu)	Väinameri		none
Võsu	Võsu, Haljala Parish	Gulf of Finland	Haljala Parish	only for crafts under 24m
Võõpsu Külasadam	Võõpsu, Setomaa Parish	Lake Lämmijärv	MTÜ Võõpsu Külasadam	none
Võõpsu	Võõpsu, Räpina Parish	Lake Pihkva	Räpina Parish	none
Väike-Turu	Tartu	Emajõgi river	Estonian State Fleet	only for crafts under 24m
Värati	Värati, Pärnu	Gulf of Riga	Meremaa Sadam OÜ	only for crafts under 24m
Värska	Värska, Setomaa Parish	Lake Pihkva	Seto Line Reisid OÜ	only for crafts under 24m
Westmeri Jahisadam	Haapsalu	Väinameri	OÜ Morobell	only for crafts under 24m
Österby	Österby, Lääne-Nigula Parish	Väinameri	Lääne-Nigula Parish	only for crafts under 24m
Ürgoru	Veskimäe, Kastre Parish	Emajõgi river	OÜ Ürgoru Paadisadam	only for crafts under 24m
Source: State Port Register
