= Annely Akkermann =

Estonian politician

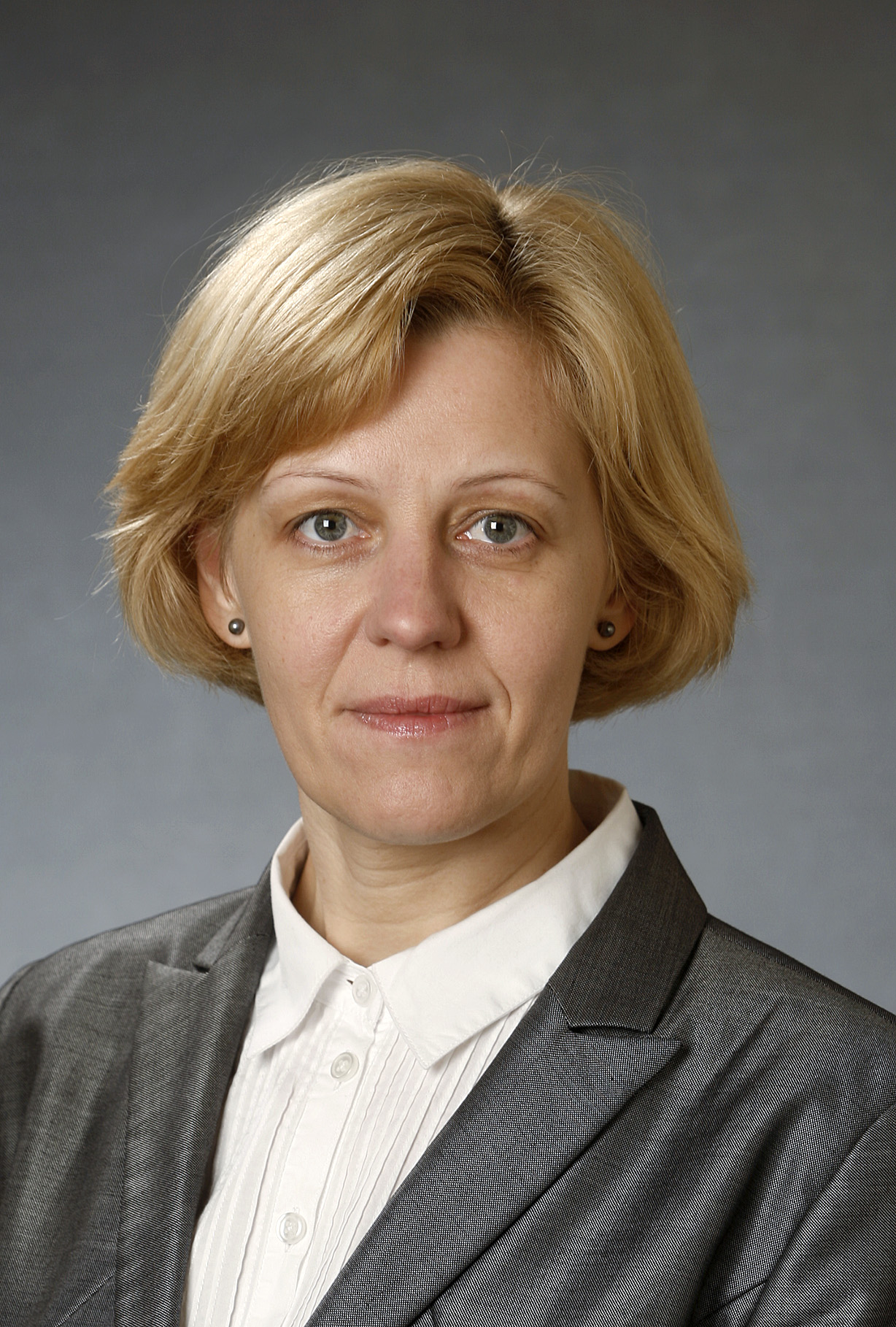

Minister of Finance
- In office 19 October 2022 – 17 April 2023
- Prime Minister: Kaja Kallas
- Preceded by: Keit Pentus-Rosimannus
- Succeeded by: Mart Võrklaev

Personal details
- Born: October 5, 1972 (age 53) Linaküla, then part of Estonian SSR, Soviet Union
- Children: 3
- Education: University of Tartu
- Occupation: Politician

Annely Akkermann (born 5 October 1972) is an Estonian politician who served as minister of finance in the government of Prime Minister Kaja Kallas between 19 October 2022 and 17 April 2023.

== Early life and education ==
Akkermann was born in Linaküla on the island of Kihnu in western Estonia. In 1990 she finished high school in Pärnu, in 2009 her studies in economics at the University of Tartu. She speaks Estonian and English.

== Career ==
From 1990 to 1991 Akkermann worked at the Commercial Bank in Pärnu. Then she acted as member in different supervisory boards and management boards: PLC Kihnurand, Management Board 1991–2006; Open Kihnu Foundation, Management Board 1992–2009; PLC Port Artur, Supervisory Board 1996–2009; PLC Kihnu Veeteed, Management Board 2002–2005; PLC Triple Invest, Supervisory Board 1997–2009; Port Artur Grupp OÜ, Supervisory Board 2002–2009; Kihnu Cultural Space Foundation, Supervisory Board since 2003; Port Artur Haldus OÜ, Supervisory Board 2003–2009; PLC Kihnurand, Supervisory Board 2006–2009; Pärnu Tourism Foundation, Supervisory Board since 2007; non-profit organisation "Liivi Lahe Kalanduskogu", Management Board 2008–2009.

== Political career ==
Akkermann's political commitment started with accession to "Pro Patria ja Res Publica Liit" (IRL). From 2005 to 2009 she was the mayor of Kihnu Municipality Government. Later from 2009 to 2011 she worked as assistant mayor of Pärnu City Government.

In the 2011 elections, Akkermann first became a member of the Riigikogu, the Estonian parliament. She works in the Ecology Committee and in the Select Budgetary Committee. Furthermore, she is the chairwoman of IRL-Naiskogu (IREN), the women's association of IRL.

== Personal life ==
Akkermann is married and has three children.

Political offices
| Preceded by Keit Pentus-Rosimannus | Minister of Finance; 2022–2023 | Succeeded by Mart Võrklaev |
