= Rootsiküla, Pärnu County =

Village in Estonia

Rootsiküla
- village
- Location in Estonia
- Coordinates: 58°06′41″N 23°59′30″E
- Country: Estonia
- County: Pärnu County
- Municipality: Kihnu Parish

Population (01.01.2000)
  - Total: 106

Rootsiküla is one of the four villages on the island of Kihnu, in southwestern Estonia. Administratively it belongs to Kihnu Parish, Pärnu County. The village occupies the southern part of the island. In 2000, Rootsiküla had a population of 106.

There is situated Kihnu Lighthouse.

== Gallery ==
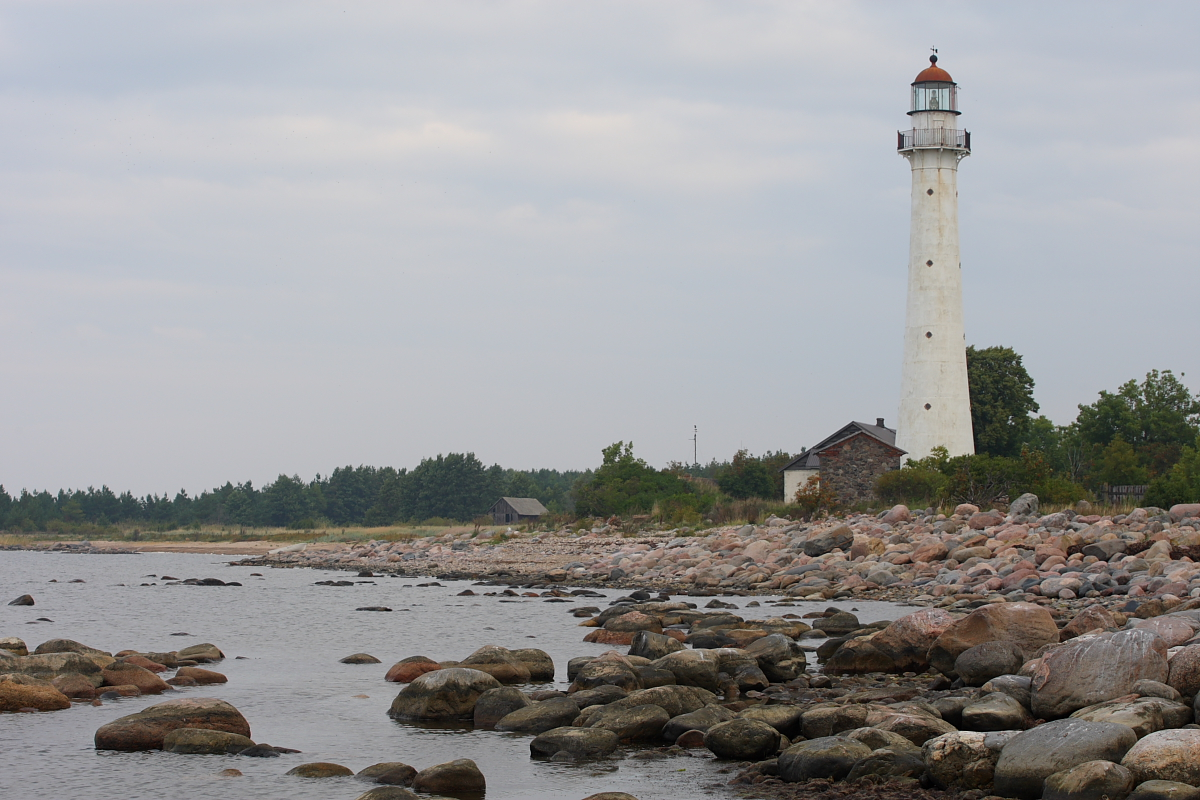
Kihnu Lighthouse

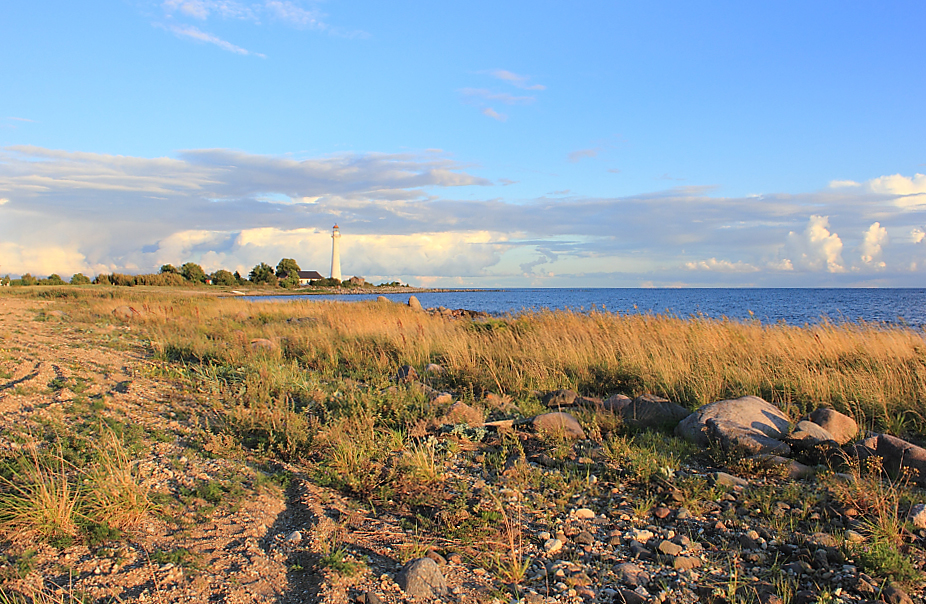
Seashore of Rootsiküla
