= Uuetoa =

Uuetoa is a surname of Estonian origin. Notable people with the surname include:

- Enn Uuetoa (1848–1913), Estonian ship captain
- Helge Uuetoa (1936–2008), Estonian painter
