= Sääre, Pärnu County =

Village in Estonia

Sääre
- village
- Location in Estonia
- Coordinates: 58°09′06″N 23°59′53″E
- Country: Estonia
- County: Pärnu County
- Municipality: Kihnu Parish

Population (01.01.2000)
  - Total: 137

Sääre is one of the four villages on the island of Kihnu, in southwestern Estonia. Administratively it belongs to Kihnu Parish, Pärnu County. The village is situated in the northern side of the island. In 2000, Sääre had a population of 137.

Kihnu Airfield is located in Sääre.

== Gallery ==
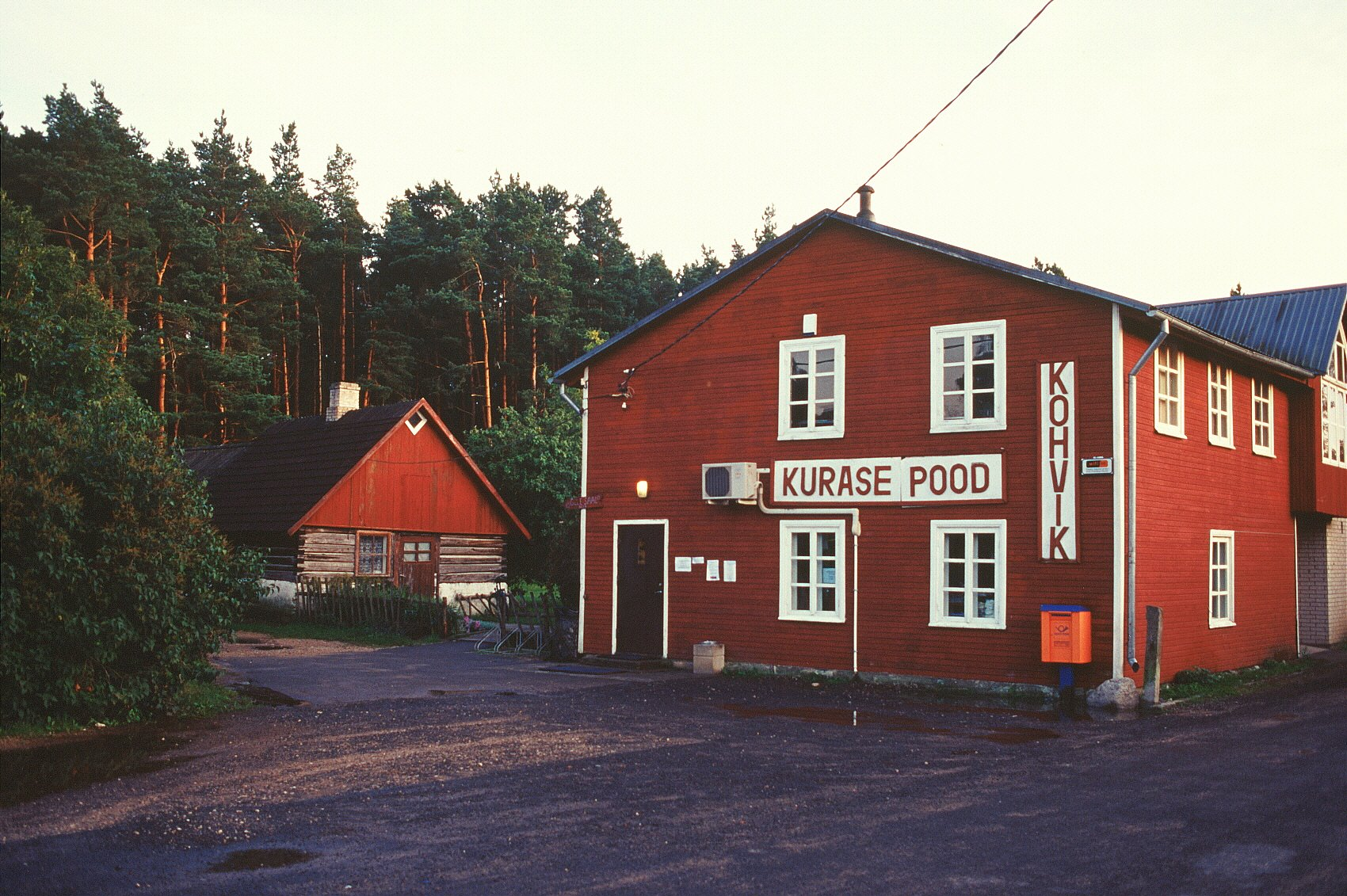
A café and shop building in Sääre

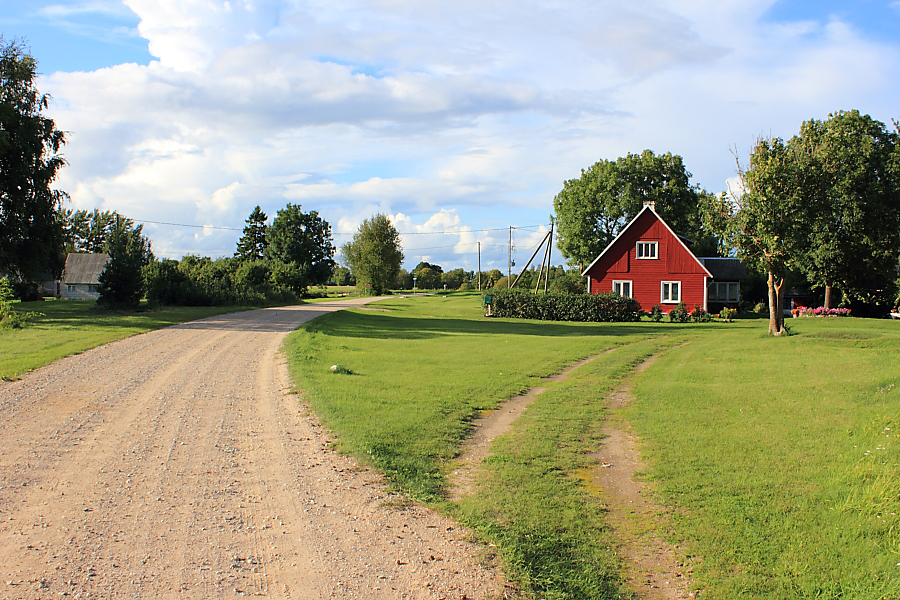
Landscape in Sääre
