= Mart Võrklaev =

Estonian politician (born 1984)

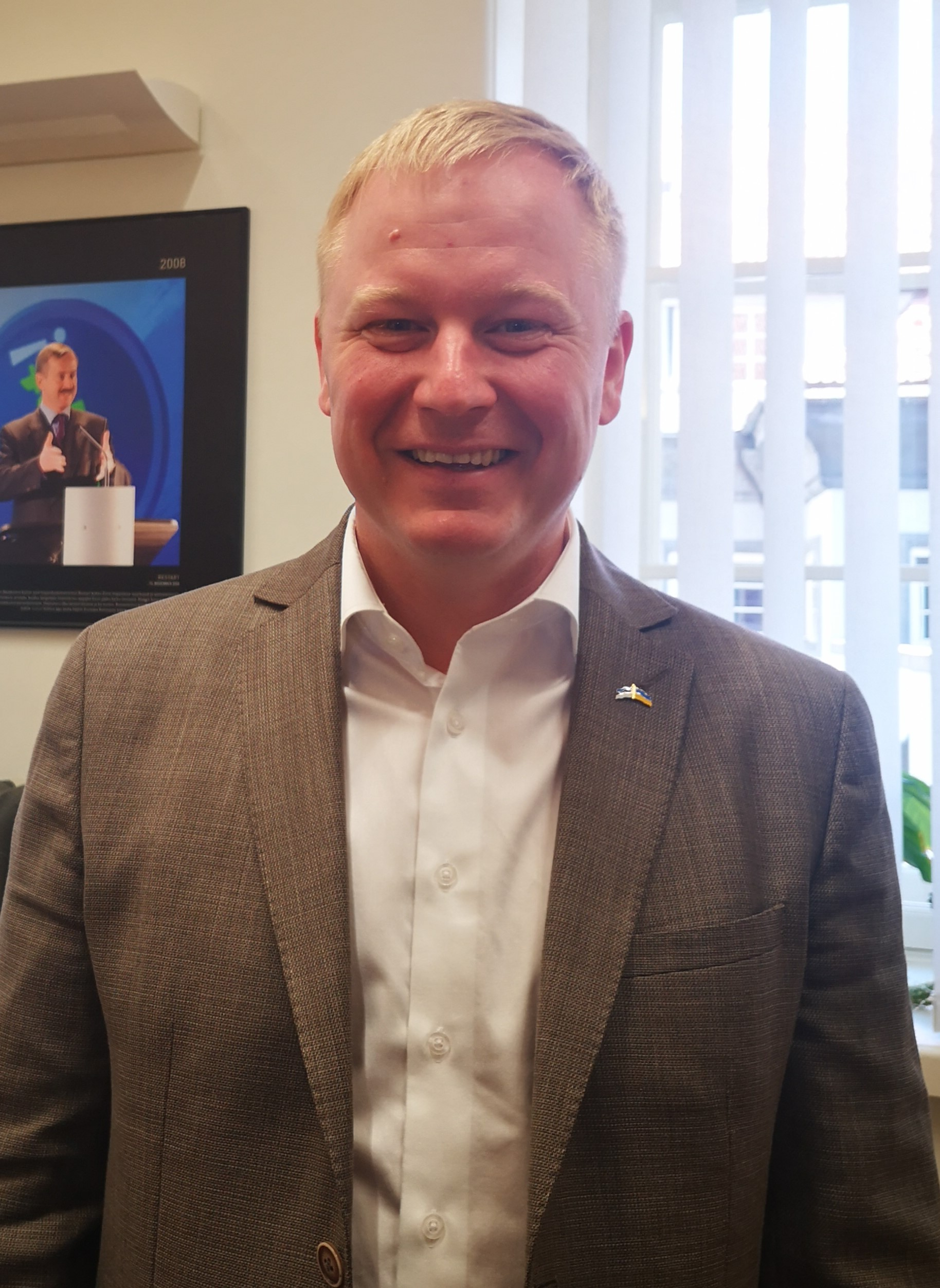
- Võrklaev in 2022

Minister of Finance
- In office 17 April 2023 – 23 July 2024
- Prime Minister: Kaja Kallas
- Preceded by: Annely Akkermann
- Succeeded by: Jürgen Ligi

Personal details
- Born: 30 May 1984 (age 42) Tallinn, then part of Estonian SSR, Soviet Union
- Party: Reform

Mart Võrklaev (born 30 May 1984) is an Estonian politician currently a member of XIV Riigikogu.

== Political career ==
Since 2009, Võrklaev has been a member of Estonian Reform Party. From 2012 to 2019, he served as Mayor of Rae Rural Municipality.

Võrklaev was sworn in as Minister of Finance in the third cabinet of Kaja Kallas on 17 April 2023.

== Other activities ==
=== European Union organizations ===
- European Investment Bank (EIB), Ex-Officio Member of the Board of Governors (since 2023)
- European Stability Mechanism (ESM), Member of the Board of Governors (since 2023)

=== International organizations ===
- European Bank for Reconstruction and Development (EBRD), Ex-Officio Member of the Board of Governors (since 2023)
- Nordic Investment Bank (NIB), Ex-Officio Member of the Board of Governors (since 2023)
- Multilateral Investment Guarantee Agency (MIGA), World Bank Group, Ex-Officio Member of the Board of Governors (since 2023)
- World Bank, Ex-Officio Member of the Board of Governors (since 2023)

Political offices
Preceded by Annely Akkermann	Minister of Finance; 2023–2024	Succeeded by Jürgen Ligi
