= Kihnu Parish =

Municipality of Estonia

Coordinates: 58.1300°N 23.9900°E

Kihnu Parish Kihnu vald
- Municipality of Estonia
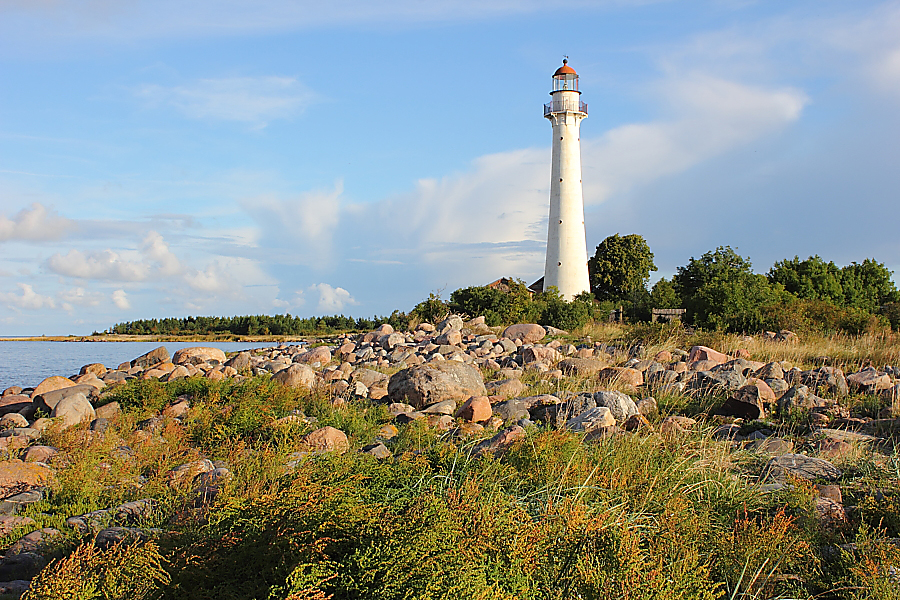
- Kihnu lighthouse

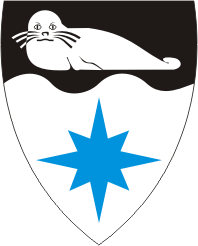
- Flag Coat of arms

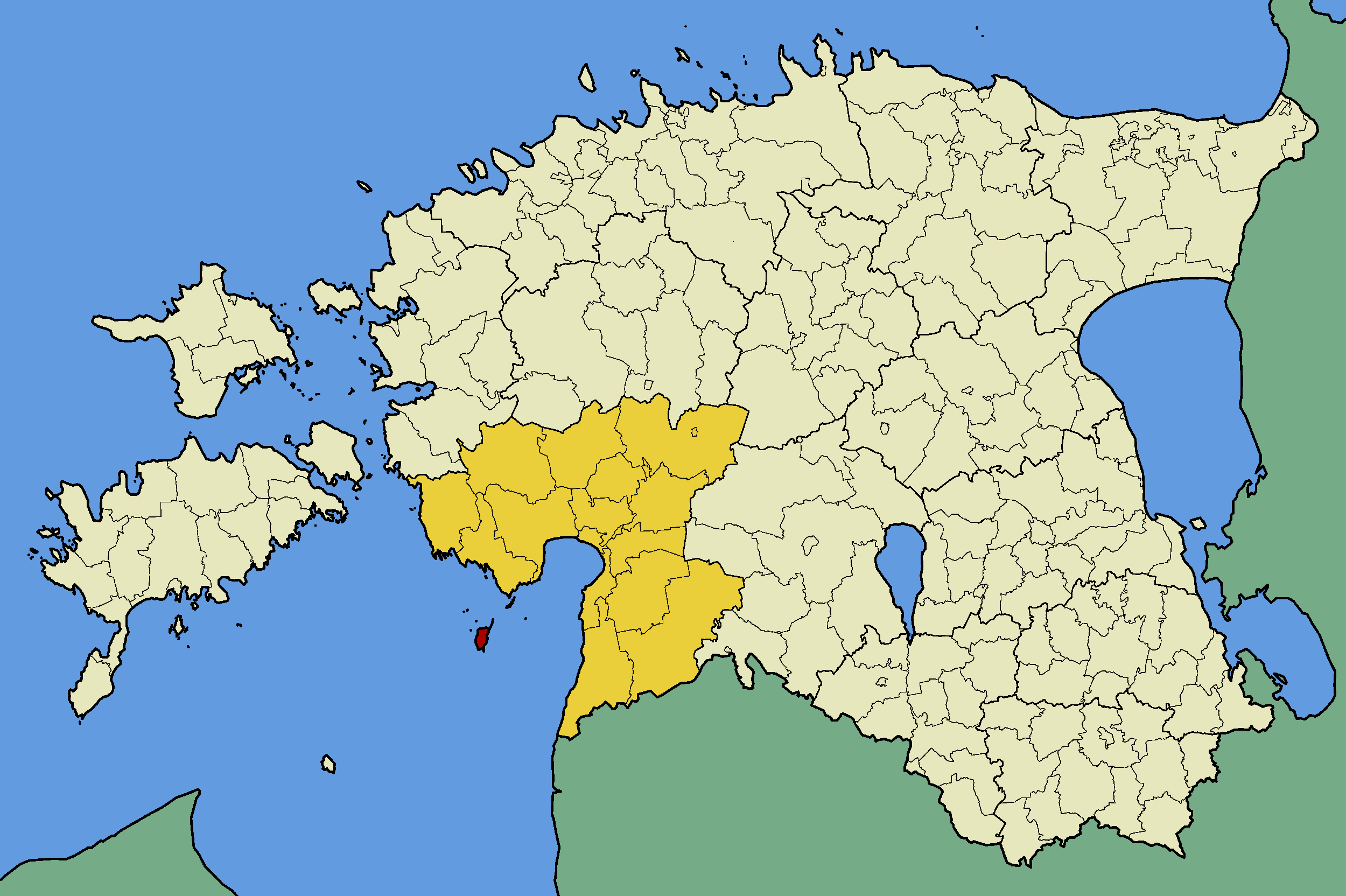
- Kihnu Parish within Pärnu County.
- Country: Estonia
- County: Pärnu County
- Administrative centre: Sääre

Area
  - Total: 16.88 km^{2} (6.52 sq mi)

Population (2026)
  - Total: 490
  - Density: 29/km^{2} (75/sq mi)
- ISO 3166 code: EE-303
- Website: kihnu.ee

Kihnu Parish (Estonian: Kihnu vald) is a rural municipality of Estonia, in Pärnu County. The parish covers the 16.88 km² area of Kihnu island, making it one of the smallest parishes in Estonia. As of 1 January 2026, Kihnu Parish had a population of 490. In 2003, UNESCO named Kihnu Island's culture as a Masterpiece of the Oral and Intangible History of Humanity, placing the island on the organization's Intangible Cultural Heritage list.

== Demographics ==
As of 1 January 2026, the parish had 490 residents, of which 242 (49.4%) were women and 248 (50.6%) were men.

=== Settlements ===
There are 4 villages in Kihnu Parish: Lemsi, Linaküla, Rootsiküla and Sääre.

=== Religion ===
Among residents of the parish above 15 years of age, 33.3 per cent declared themselves to be Orthodox, 2.1 33.3 per cent to be Lutheran, while 18.8 per cent left their beliefs undeclared. The largest demographic segment of the parish, 43.8 per cent, were religiously unaffiliated. 2.1 per cent of the population did not specify their religious affiliation.

== Notable people ==
- Enn Uuetoa (1848 in Kihnu – 1913), a ship captain who command large ships without the use of either a compass or a sextant.
- Maaja Vadi (born 1955 in Kihnu), a management scholar and psychologist; Professor of Management at the University of Tartu and has been dean of the university’s economics and business faculty, 2011–2014
- Annely Akkermann (born 1972 in Linaküla), politician, Minister of finance, 2022 to 2023.
