= Lemsi =

Village in Estonia

- village
- Location in Estonia
- Coordinates: 58°07′48″N 24°00′11″E
- Country: Estonia
- County: Pärnu County
- Municipality: Kihnu Parish

Population (01.01.2000)
  - Total: 145

Lemsi is one of the four villages on the island of Kihnu, in southwestern Estonia. Administratively it belongs to Kihnu Parish, Pärnu County. The village is situated on the eastern side of the island. In 2000, Lemsi had a population of 145.

The Kihnu Harbour and Kihnu St. Nicholas' Church is located in Lemsi.

== Gallery ==
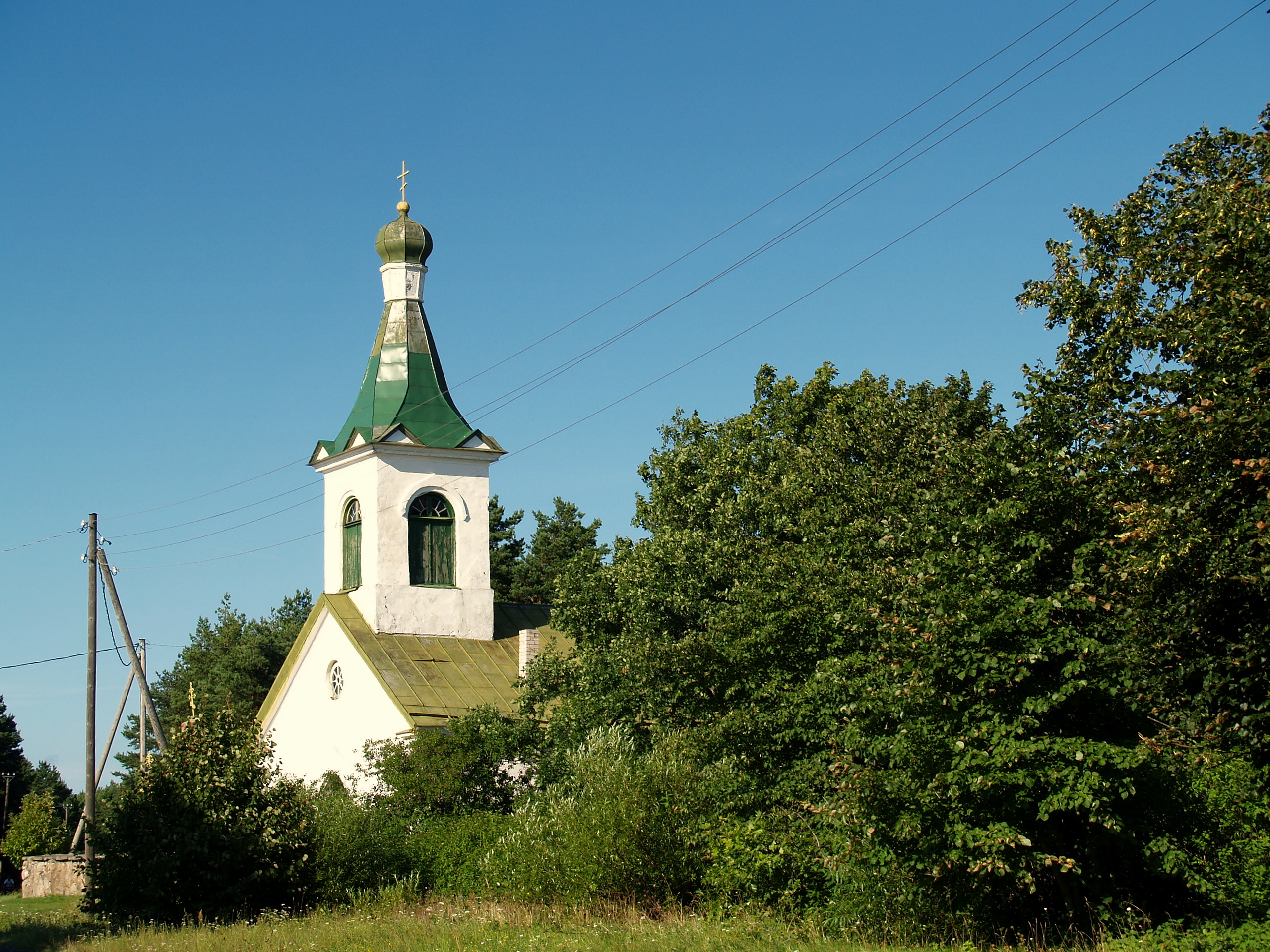
Kihnu St. Nicholas' Church

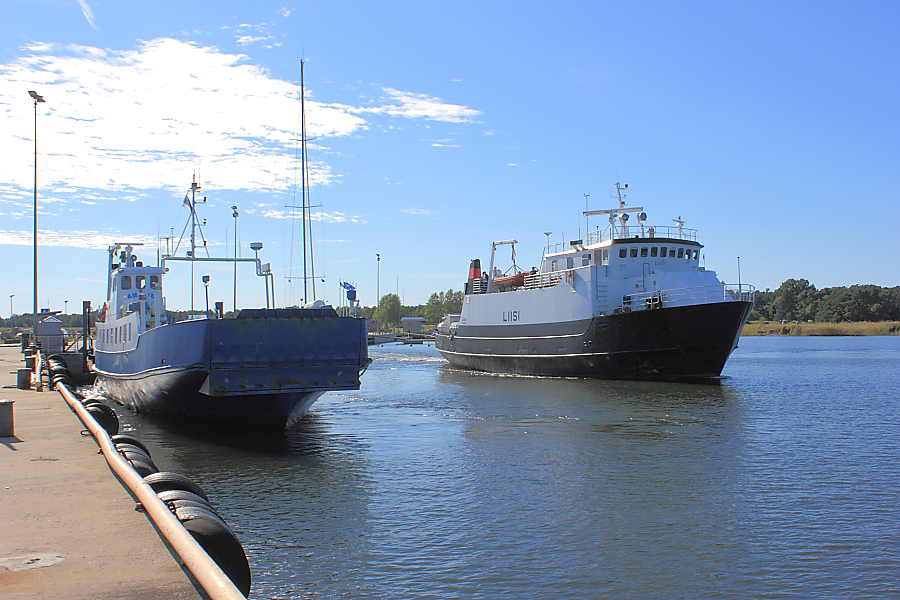
Kihnu Harbour
