= Paldiski South Harbour =

Harbour in Estonia

Paldiski South Harbour (Paldiski Lõunasadam)
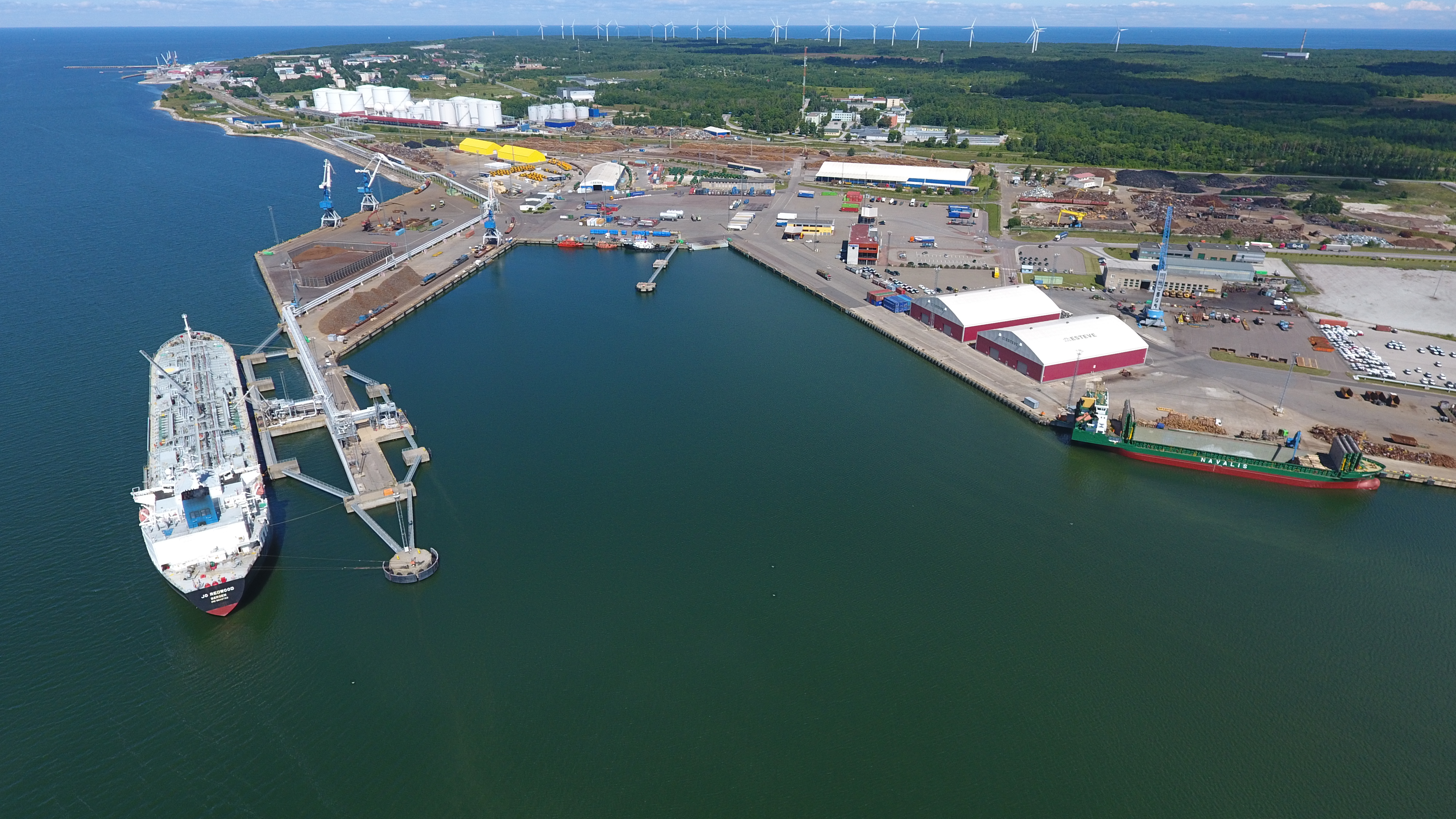
- Paldiski South Harbour

Location
- Country: Estonia
- Location: Paldiski
- Coordinates: 59°20′N 024°05′E

Details
- Opened: 1994
- Owned by: Port of Tallinn
- Type of harbour: Cargo harbour
- Size of harbour: 134,7 ha (aquatory)
- Land area: 141,1 ha
- No. of berths: 10

Statistics
- Website http://www.portoftallinn.com/paldiski-south-harbour

Paldiski South Harbour is a cargo harbour located in Paldiski, Estonia, 45 km west of the capital city Tallinn.

The harbour is owned by Port of Tallinn. Paldiski South Harbour is the main Ro-Ro harbour for Estonia. The main cargo groups handled in the harbour are: Ro-Ro, general cargo/break bulk cargo, solid bulk goods and liquid bulk. The strategic focus has been shifted to the handling of rolling stock goods and to the processing of Estonian import-export goods as well as handling various goods passing through Estonia as transit. A rising trend is the carriage and pre-sales service of the new passenger cars.

The Port also includes an industrial park of 34 hectares.

== Carriers and destinations ==
Company	Ship	Route	Notes
(Estonia) Tallink	MV Superfast IX	Paldiski – Kapellskär	

== See also ==
- Paldiski North Harbour
- Ports of the Baltic Sea

== Ro-Ro ==
There is a wide range of services provided in the harbour for every type of wheeled cargo: trailers and semitrailers; roll trailers and MAFI's, incl. containers on roll trailers; new passager cars, trucks and buses; agricultural and building machinery. Also different kind of project cargo and High&Heavy cargo served by Ro-Ro lines which are calling the port. Remarkable amount of that kind of cargo and also heavy machinery is loaded to rail and forwarded to the Russian and Central Asian markets.

Paldiski South Harbour has the widest network of Ro-Ro lines in the Baltic States with the connection with ports situated in Finland, Sweden, Russia, Netherlands, Belgium, Germany and UK.

There are three terminals with a total of 25 ha terminal territory in Paldiski South Harbour to serve the volume of new cars transshipped through the port to the Estonian and Baltic States market and also to Russia. The capacity for transshipment of new cars through Port of Tallinn is up to 300 000 units. Storage, transportation by trucks and rail and also PDI and PPO services are rendered. Port infrastructure is ready to serve regular Ro–Ro lines with new cars on board as well as PCC vessels.
