= Linaküla =

Village in Estonia

- village
- Location in Estonia
- Coordinates: 58°08′10″N 23°58′06″E
- Country: Estonia
- County: Pärnu County
- Municipality: Kihnu Parish

Population (01.01.2000)
  - Total: 122

Linaküla is one of the four villages on the island of Kihnu, in southwestern Estonia. Administratively it belongs to Kihnu Parish, Pärnu County. The village occupies the western coast of the island. In 2000, Linaküla had a population of 122.

Local government building, cultural centre, primary school and Kihnu Museum are located in Linaküla. There's also a beach camping for tourists.

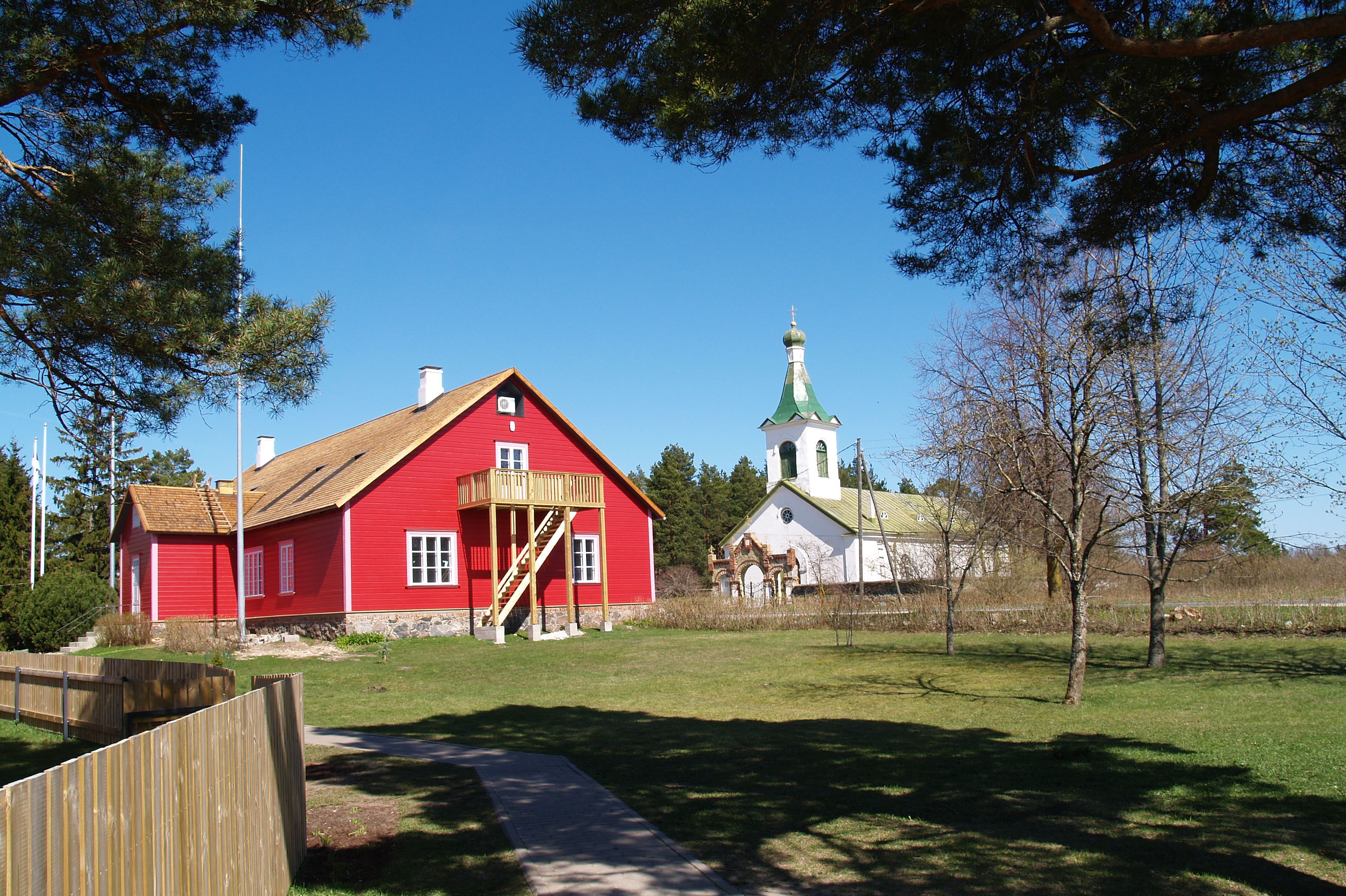
Kihnu Museum on the left and Kihnu St. Nicholas' Church on the right.

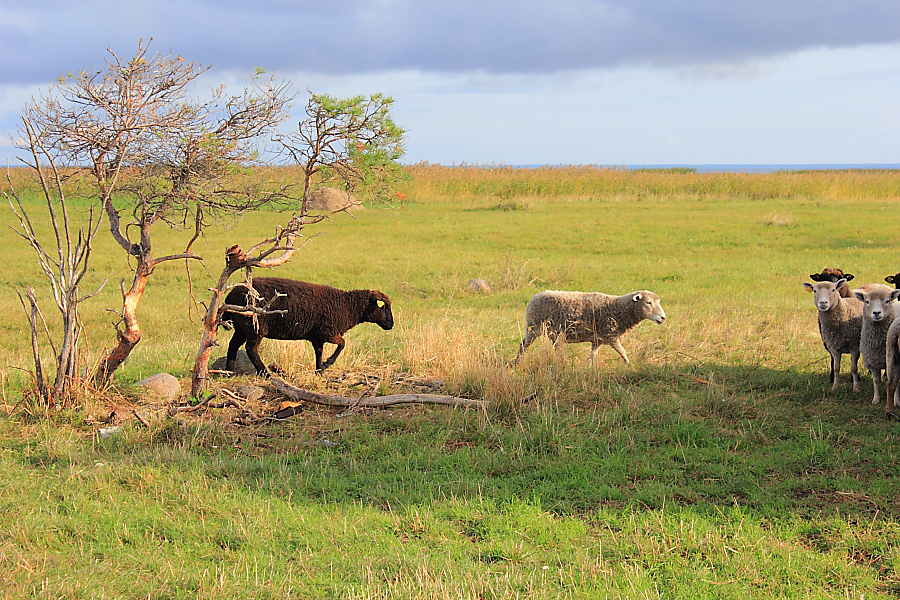
Sheep on the coastal meadow
