= Kihnu Lighthouse =

Lighthouse in Estonia

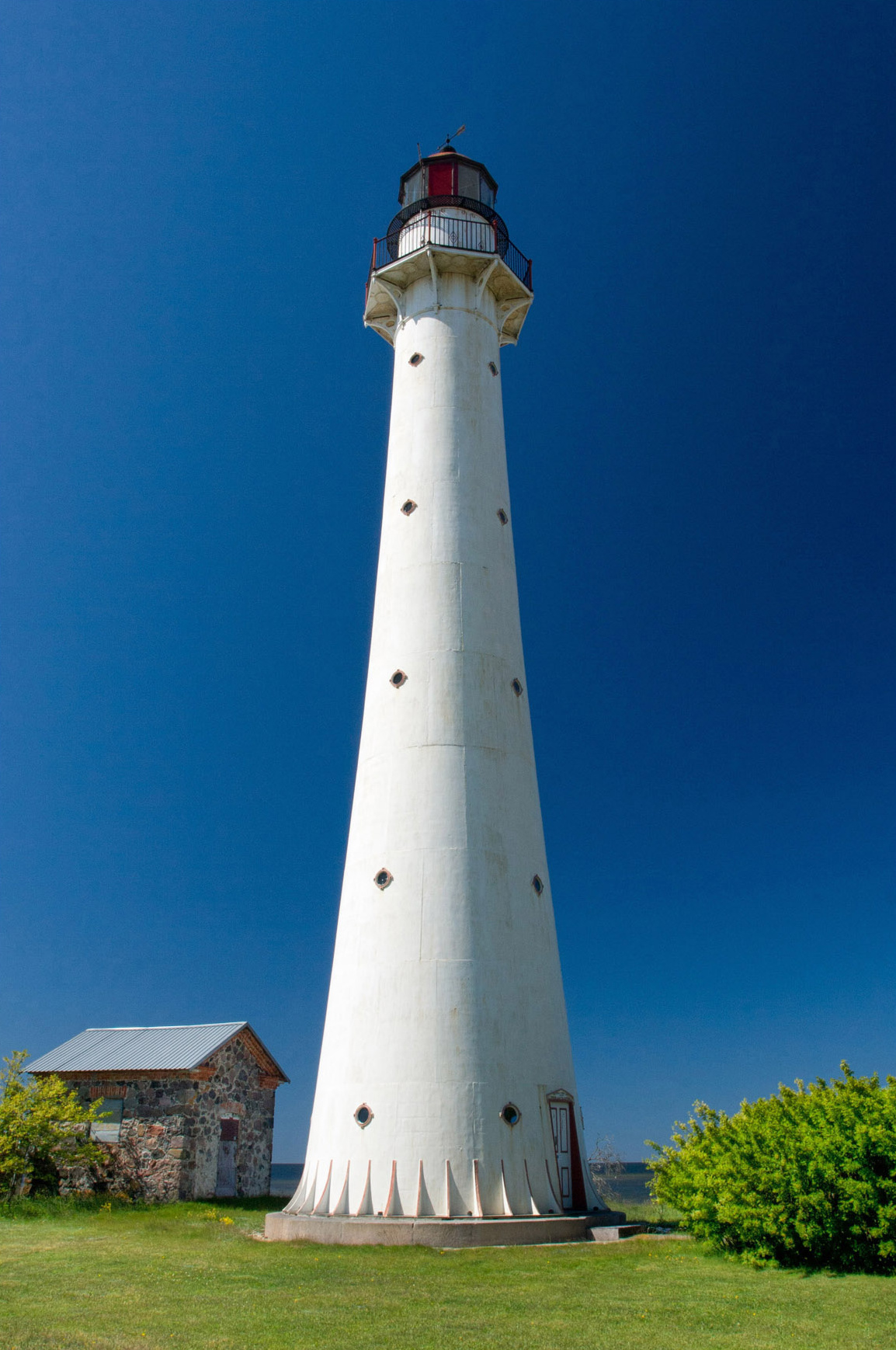
- Location: Kihnu; Pärnu County; Estonia
- Coordinates: 58°05′49.9″N 23°58′16.3″E

Tower
- Constructed: 1865
- Construction: cast iron tower
- Height: 28 metres (92 ft)
- Shape: tapered cylindrical tower with balcony and lantern
- Markings: white tower, red lantern dome

Light
- Focal height: 29 metres (95 ft)
- Range: 11 nautical miles (20 km; 13 mi)
- Characteristic: Fl WR 12s
- Estonia no.: EVA 840

Kihnu Lighthouse (Estonian: Kihnu tuletorn) is a lighthouse located in Kihnu, an island in the northern Gulf of Riga in Pärnu County, in Estonia.

The lighthouse was prefabricated in England; and assembled in 1865. The lighthouse uses a Fresnel lens, with the lighthouse's structure made out of tapered cast iron, painted white with the lantern dome painted in red. The lighthouse has a glare configuration of: two 1.5 s glares every 12 s.

== See also ==
- List of lighthouses in Estonia
