= Paldiski North Harbour =

Harbour in Estonia

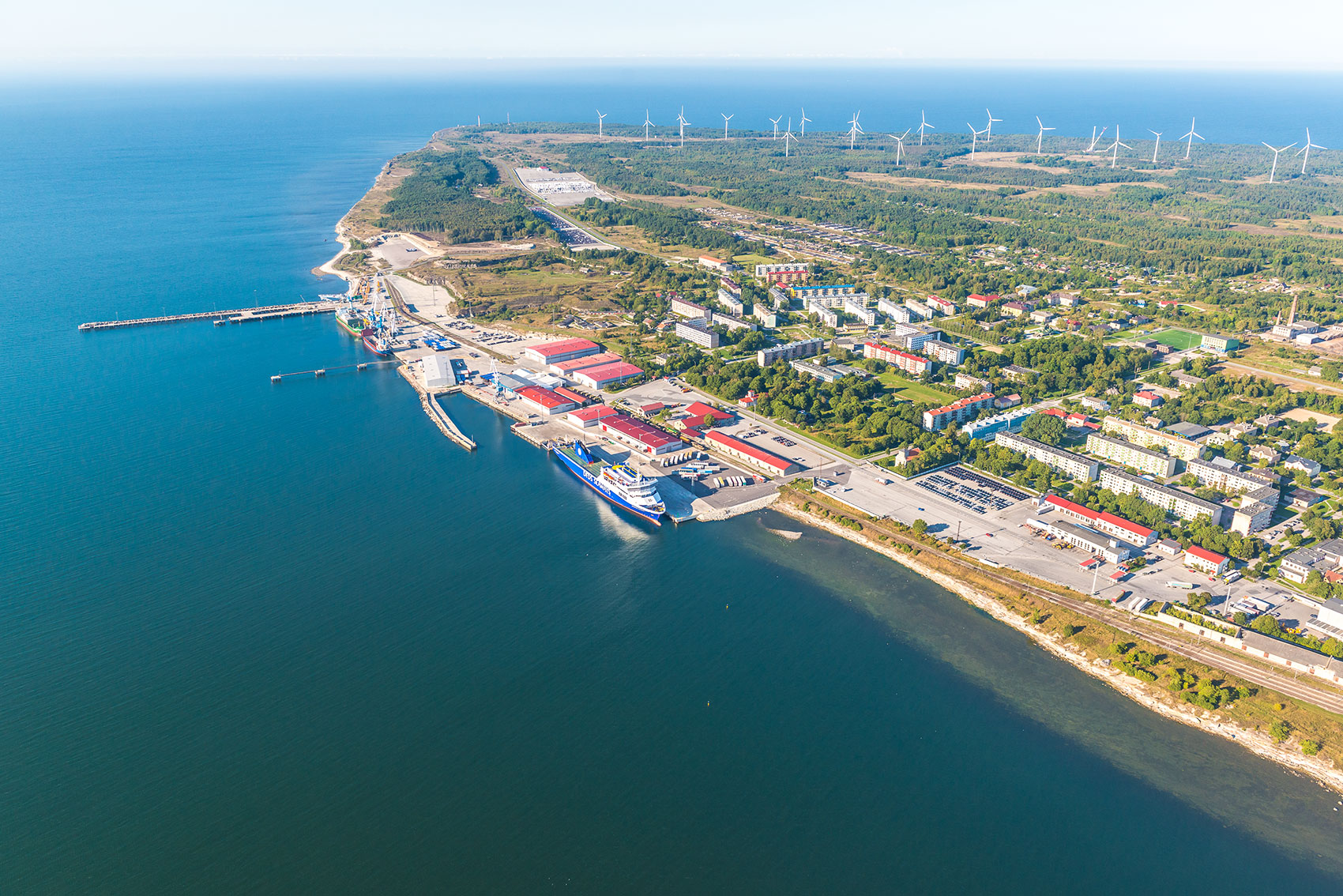

Location
- Country: Estonia
- Location: Paldiski
- Coordinates: 59°20′59″N 24°2′51″E
- UN/LOCODE: EEPLN

Details
- Opened: 1995
- Owned by: Paldiski Sadamate AS
- Type of harbour: Cargo harbour
- Size of harbour: 79,2 ha (aquatory)
- Land area: 15,79 ha
- No. of berths: 5

Statistics
- Website portofpaldiski.ee

Paldiski North Harbour (Estonian: Paldiski Põhjasadam), officially: Port of Paldiski, is a cargo harbour located in Paldiski, Estonia, 45 km west of the capital city Tallinn. It is near the Paldiski South Harbour.

There are total of 5 berths in the harbour with maximum depth of 11.8 meters.

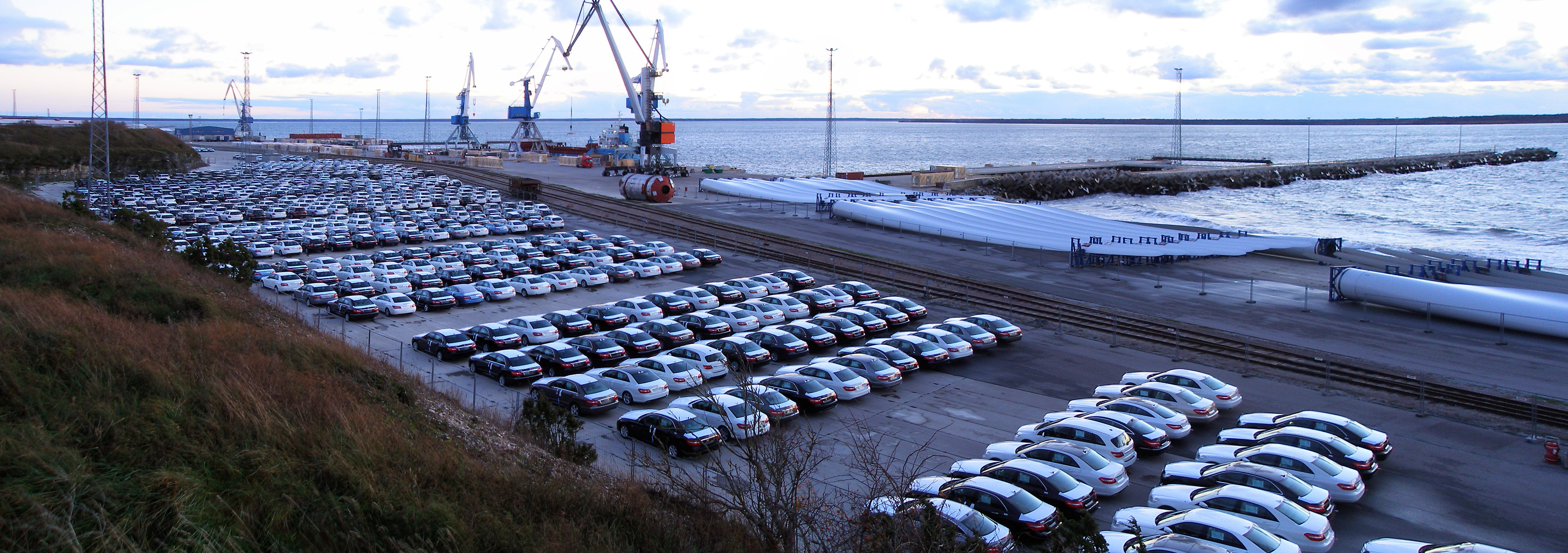
Paldiski North Harbour in 2010

== Carriers and destinations ==
Company	Ship	Route	Notes
(Denmark) DFDS Seaways	MS Sirena Seaways	Paldiski – Kapellskär	

== See also ==
- Paldiski South Harbour
- Ports of the Baltic Sea
