= Leppneeme =

Village in Estonia

- village
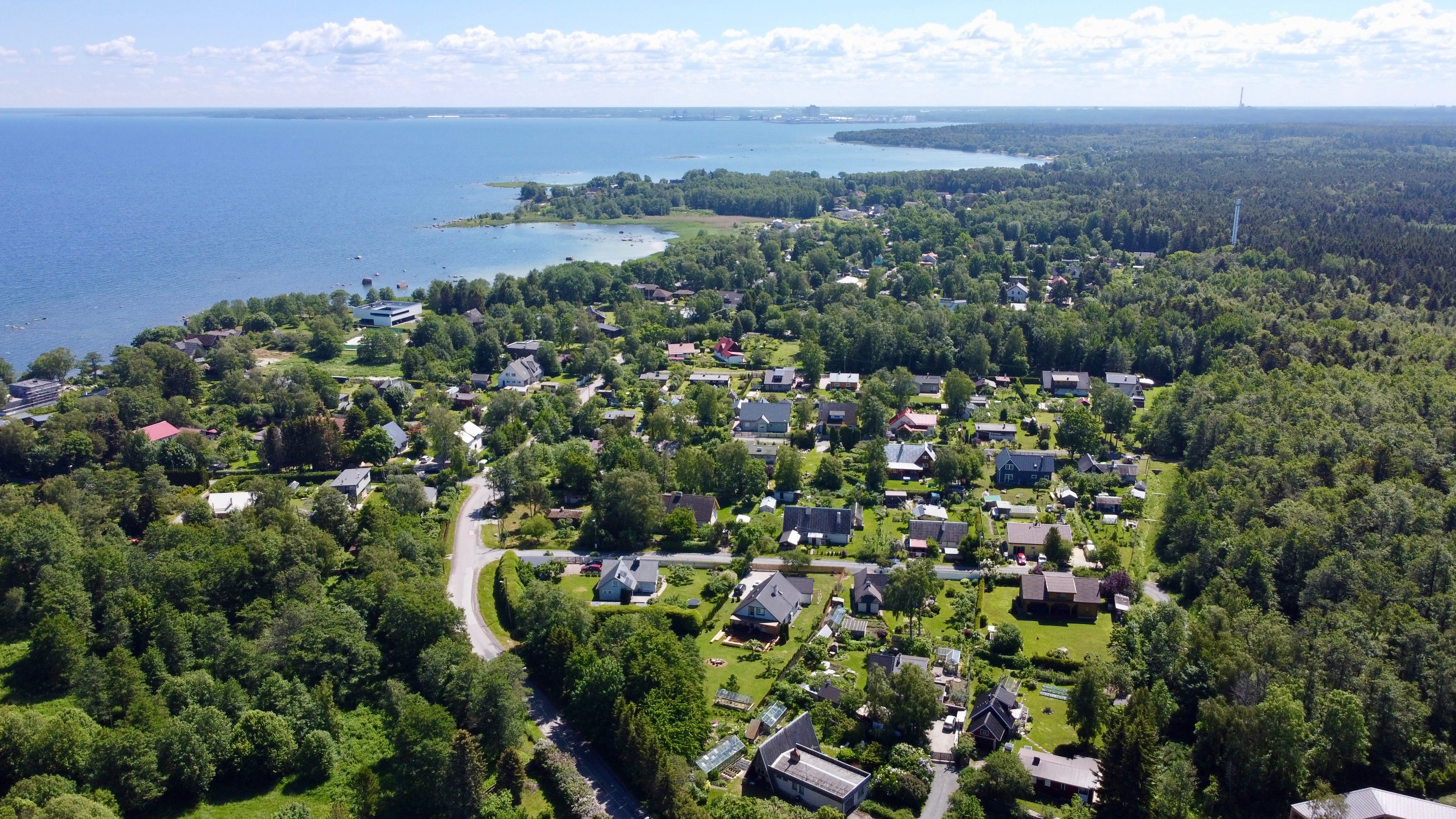
- Aerial view of Leppneeme

- Location in Estonia
- Coordinates: 59°32′53″N 24°51′58″E
- Country: Estonia
- County: Harju County
- Municipality: Viimsi Parish
- First mentioned: 1376

Government
  - Village elder: Arvi Piirsalu

Population (2011 Census)
  - Total: 464

Drone video of Leppneeme harbour and village (June 2022)

Leppneeme is a village in Viimsi Parish, Harju County in northern Estonia. It is located about 14 km (9 mi) northeast of the centre of Tallinn, on the northeastern coast of the Viimsi peninsula by Muuga Bay. As of the 2011 census, the settlement's population was 464.

Leppneeme harbour is the main point for traffic to and from the island of Prangli. The corresponding harbour on Prangli's side is in Kelnase.

Leppneeme was first mentioned in 1376 as Thusnes.
