= Kihnu =

Island in Estonia

Kihnu Kihnu Kynö
- Island
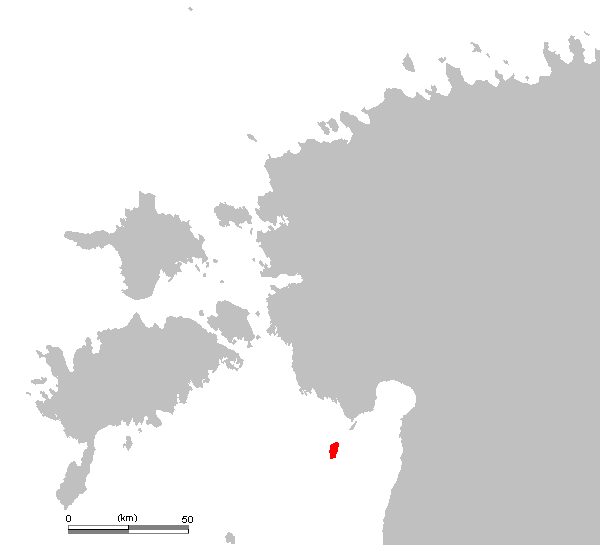
- Gulf of Riga, with Kihnu and other islands

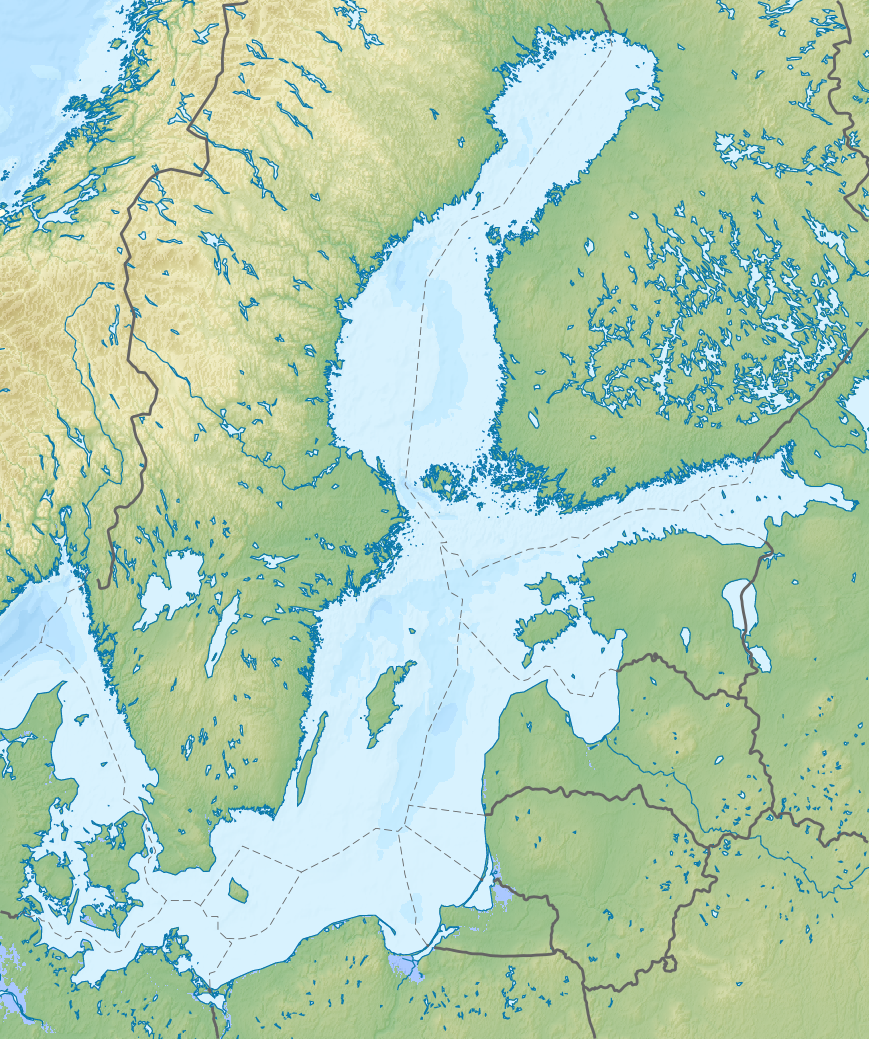
- Location within Europe Location within Baltic Sea region Location within Estonia
- Coordinates: 58°07′48″N 23°59′24″E
- Country: Estonia
- Region: Pärnu County
- Municipality: Kihnu Parish

Area
  - Total: 16.38 km^{2} (6.32 sq mi)
- Elevation: 29.6 m (97 ft)

Population (2013)
  - Total: 690
  - Density: 42/km^{2} (110/sq mi)
- Time zone: UTC+2 (EET)
  - Summer (DST): UTC+3 (EEST)
- Postal codes: 88005

Kihnu is an Estonian island in the Baltic Sea. With an area of 16.4 km^{2} (6.3 sq mi), it is the largest island in the Gulf of Riga and the seventh largest in the country. With a length of 7 km (4.3 mi) and width of 3.3 km (2.1 mi), its highest point is 8.9 metres (29.2 ft) above sea level.

Kihnu belongs to Pärnu County and, together with neighbouring islands, forms Kihnu Parish, one of the smallest municipalities of the country, with an area of 16.8 km^{2} (6.5 sq mi). There are four villages: Lemsi, Linaküla, Rootsiküla, and Sääre.

Kihnu can be reached by plane from Pärnu or by ferry from Manilaid.

UNESCO proclaimed Kihnu's cultural space and traditions as a Masterpiece of the Oral and Intangible Heritage of Humanity on 7 November 2003.

Kihnu is also called Kihnumua in the local dialect. Names in other languages include Ķīļu in Latvian, Kynö in Standard Swedish, Kin in Estonian Swedish, and historically, Kühnö in German. In Estonian Sign Language, the island is signed by imitating the vertical stripes of a Kihnu skirt. There are various theories on the etymology of the name Kihnu, with no consensus. The earliest recorded version of the name is Kyne, from 1386.

== Culture ==
As the men of Kihnu have been frequently away at sea, women have run everyday life on the island and became the guardians of the island's cultural heritage, which includes handicrafts, dances, games, and music. The latter is an especially important part of the island's traditions and accompanies handicrafts, religious feasts, and other celebrations. Ancient runo-styled songs are also important, as is traditional clothing adorned with decorations and bright colours. There are elaborate wedding traditions, which are considered the "most complex and bright expression" of Kihnu culture.

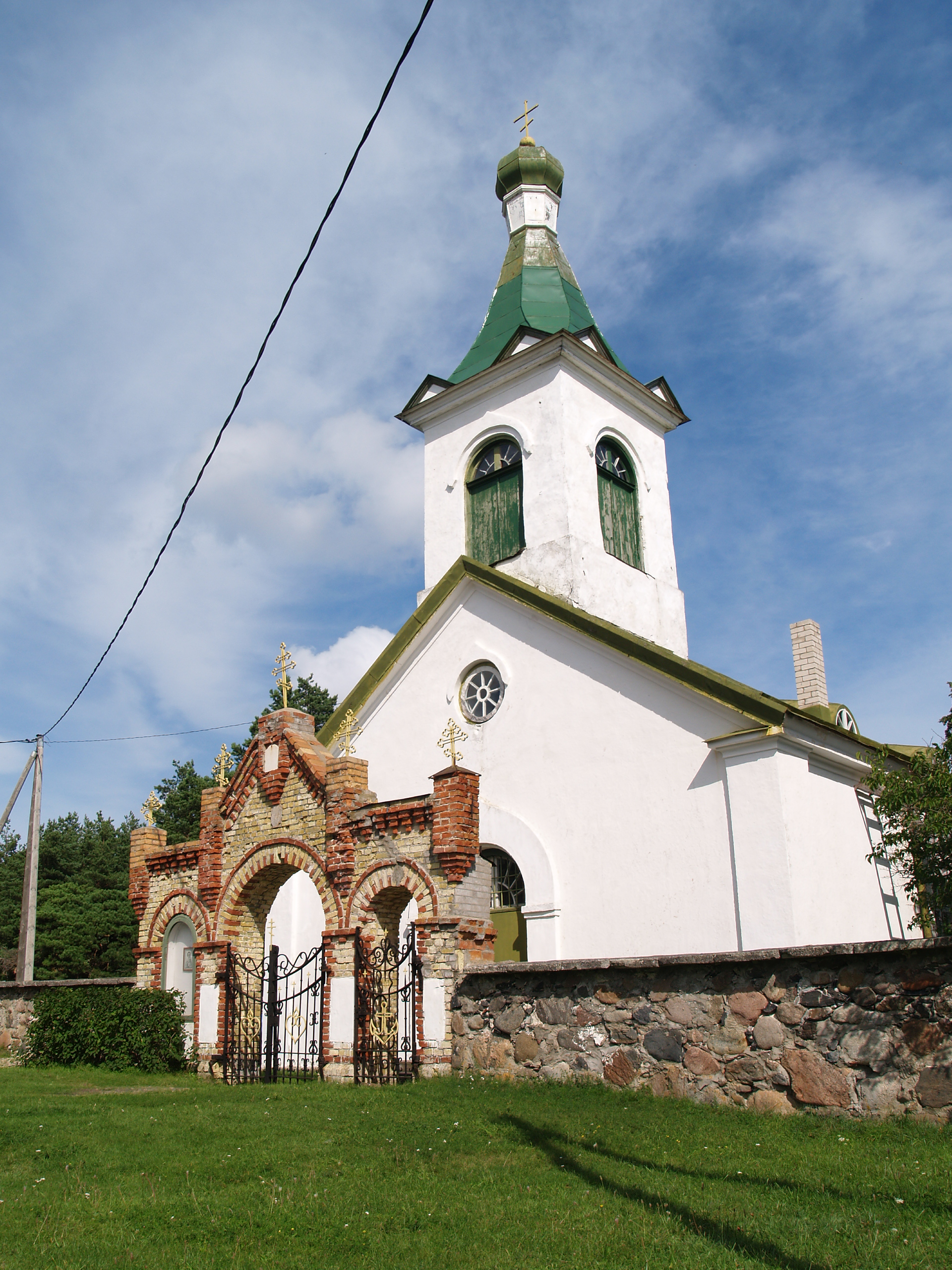
St. Nicholas Orthodox Church, Kihnu

Most inhabitants of Kihnu are Orthodox Christians, descendants of converts in the nineteenth century.

Kihnu is known for its handicrafts and distinctive traditional clothing, which is still commonly worn today. It includes striped skirts (kört), patterned knit men's sweaters (troi), and knit mittens. Young women have traditionally organised evening get-togethers (ülalistmine, i.e., "sitting (staying) up (late)") to do handicrafts.

Traditional cuisine includes rye bread with potatoes, pork fat, or Baltic herring added to the dough; eel soup, prepared by fishers; and sweet milk soup, an important dish at weddings. Seal hunting is practiced in Kihnu, and the meat is considered a delicacy. Another distinctive delicacy is the eggs of semi-domesticated mergansers (waterbirds), also used for baking cakes.

In the 19th and early 20th centuries, numerous men from Kihnu became sailors. The most famous of them was the largely self-taught captain Enn Uuetoa, also known as Kihnu Jõnn (1848–1913; Jõnn is the local pronunciation of the name Enn).

== Language ==
The Kihnu dialect is thought to belong to the insular dialect group of North Estonian, along with the dialects of Saaremaa, Muhu, and Hiiumaa. Unlike the standard Estonian language, the Kihnu dialect has the vocal harmony found in other Finnic languages. Also unlike standard Estonian, the Kihnu dialect does not have the sound "h" at the beginning of a word—it is used only within words. The vocabulary of the language has also been influenced by other languages. The dialect includes triphthongs. The special intonation gives the listener the impression that the speaker is singing while speaking.

== Geography and climate ==
The island has a sandy interior and a rocky coast made up of more than fifty islets, which are an important nesting ground for birds. Along the dunes, beach ridges, and sands of the eastern part, the island reaches its maximum height of 29.6 m above sea level.

Climate data for Kihnu (normals 1991–2020, extremes 1931–present)
Month	Jan	Feb	Mar	Apr	May	Jun	Jul	Aug	Sep	Oct	Nov	Dec	Year
Record high °C (°F)	8.1 (46.6)	6.4 (43.5)	17.2 (63.0)	23.9 (75.0)	29.3 (84.7)	31.4 (88.5)	31.8 (89.2)	31.7 (89.1)	26.6 (79.9)	19.3 (66.7)	12.8 (55.0)	9.3 (48.7)	31.8 (89.2)
Mean daily maximum °C (°F)	0.0 (32.0)	−1.0 (30.2)	1.8 (35.2)	7.6 (45.7)	14.0 (57.2)	18.1 (64.6)	21.3 (70.3)	20.7 (69.3)	16.1 (61.0)	10.2 (50.4)	5.4 (41.7)	2.3 (36.1)	9.7 (49.5)
Daily mean °C (°F)	−1.7 (28.9)	−2.9 (26.8)	−0.5 (31.1)	4.5 (40.1)	10.5 (50.9)	14.9 (58.8)	18.3 (64.9)	18.0 (64.4)	13.8 (56.8)	8.3 (46.9)	3.8 (38.8)	0.8 (33.4)	7.3 (45.1)
Mean daily minimum °C (°F)	−3.6 (25.5)	−4.9 (23.2)	−2.7 (27.1)	2.1 (35.8)	7.7 (45.9)	12.3 (54.1)	15.6 (60.1)	15.4 (59.7)	11.5 (52.7)	6.4 (43.5)	2.1 (35.8)	−1.0 (30.2)	5.1 (41.2)
Record low °C (°F)	−32.4 (−26.3)	−30.8 (−23.4)	−22.6 (−8.7)	−15.7 (3.7)	−2.0 (28.4)	3.2 (37.8)	7.1 (44.8)	6.1 (43.0)	0.6 (33.1)	−5.5 (22.1)	−14.5 (5.9)	−29.5 (−21.1)	−32.4 (−26.3)
Average precipitation mm (inches)	42 (1.7)	35 (1.4)	33 (1.3)	33 (1.3)	36 (1.4)	59 (2.3)	62 (2.4)	66 (2.6)	54 (2.1)	67 (2.6)	57 (2.2)	52 (2.0)	595 (23.4)
Average precipitation days (≥ 1.0 mm)	10.3	8.3	7.9	7.1	7.0	8.3	7.6	8.6	8.9	11.2	11.3	11.6	108.1
Average relative humidity (%)	88	88	85	80	77	80	79	79	81	83	86	87	83
Source 1: Estonian Weather Service
Source 2: NOAA/NCEI (average precipitation days 1991-2020)

== Images ==
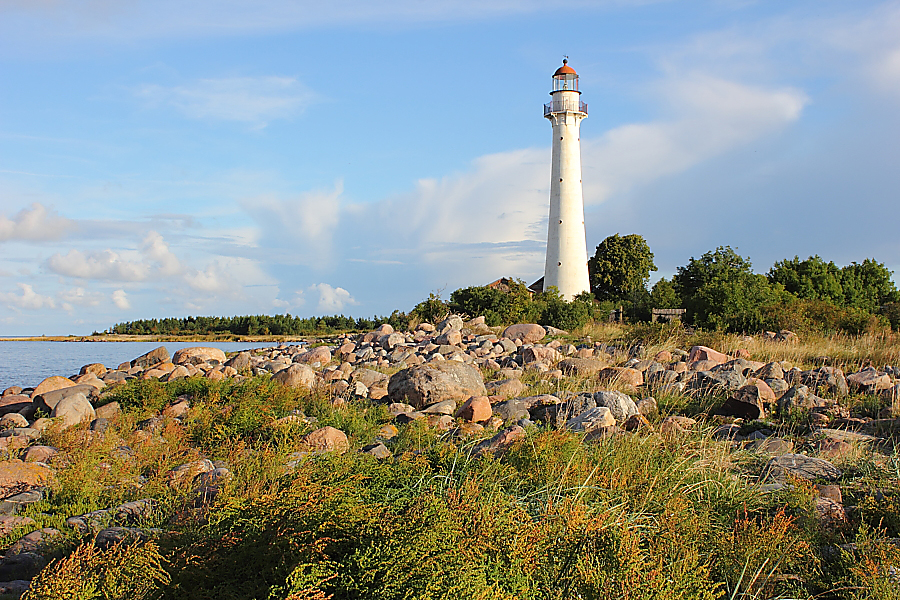
Kihnu Lighthouse

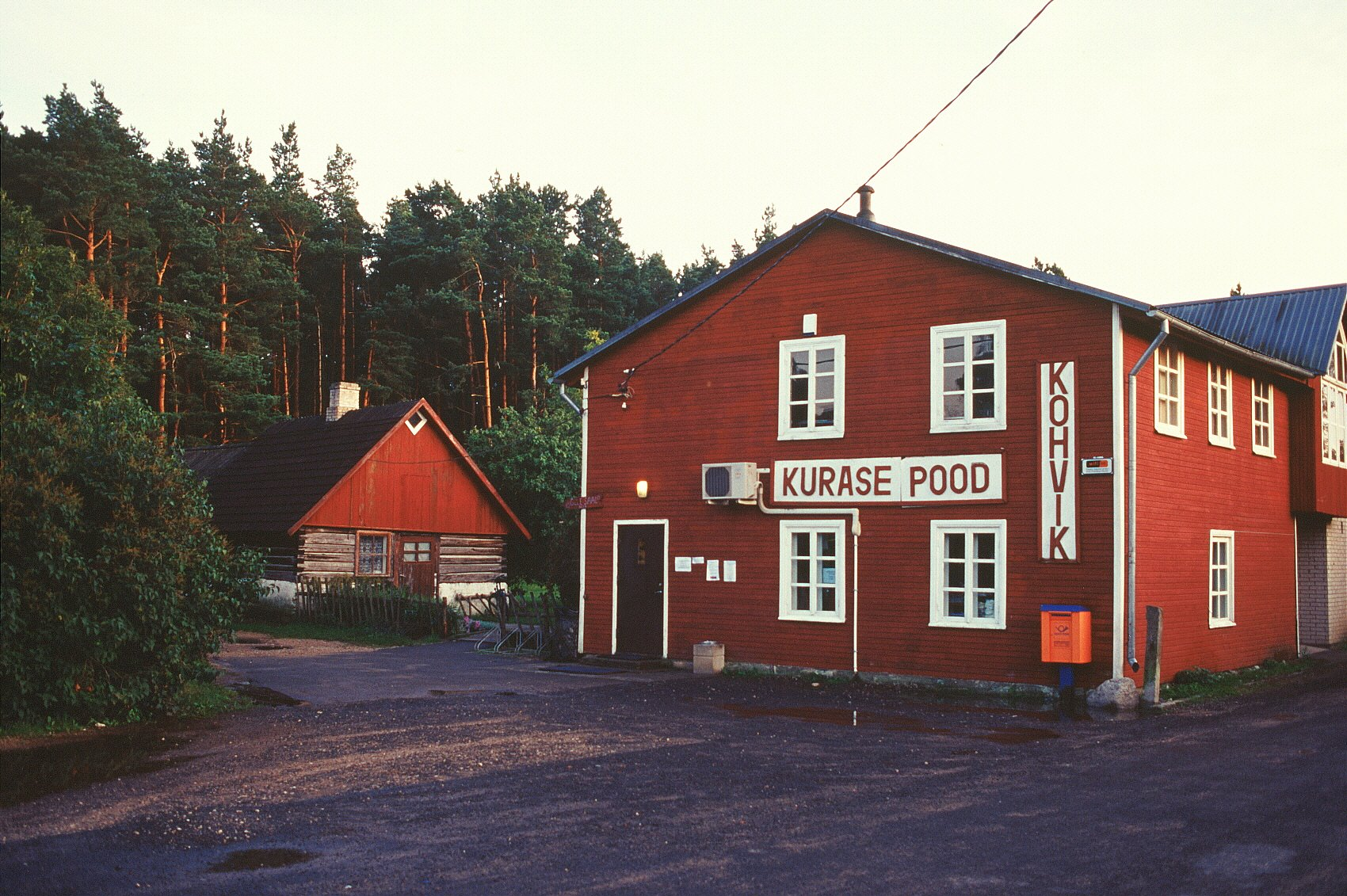
An inn

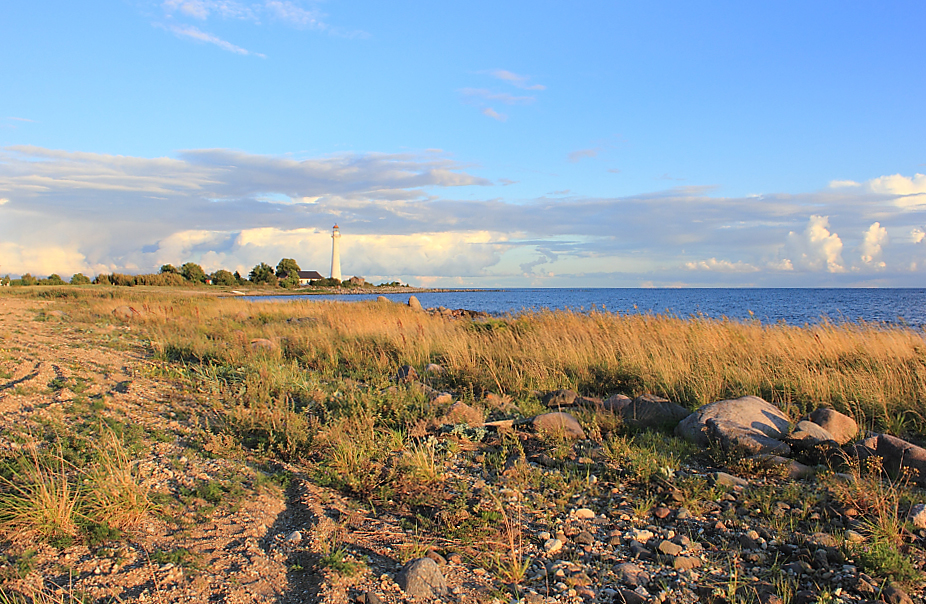
Seashore

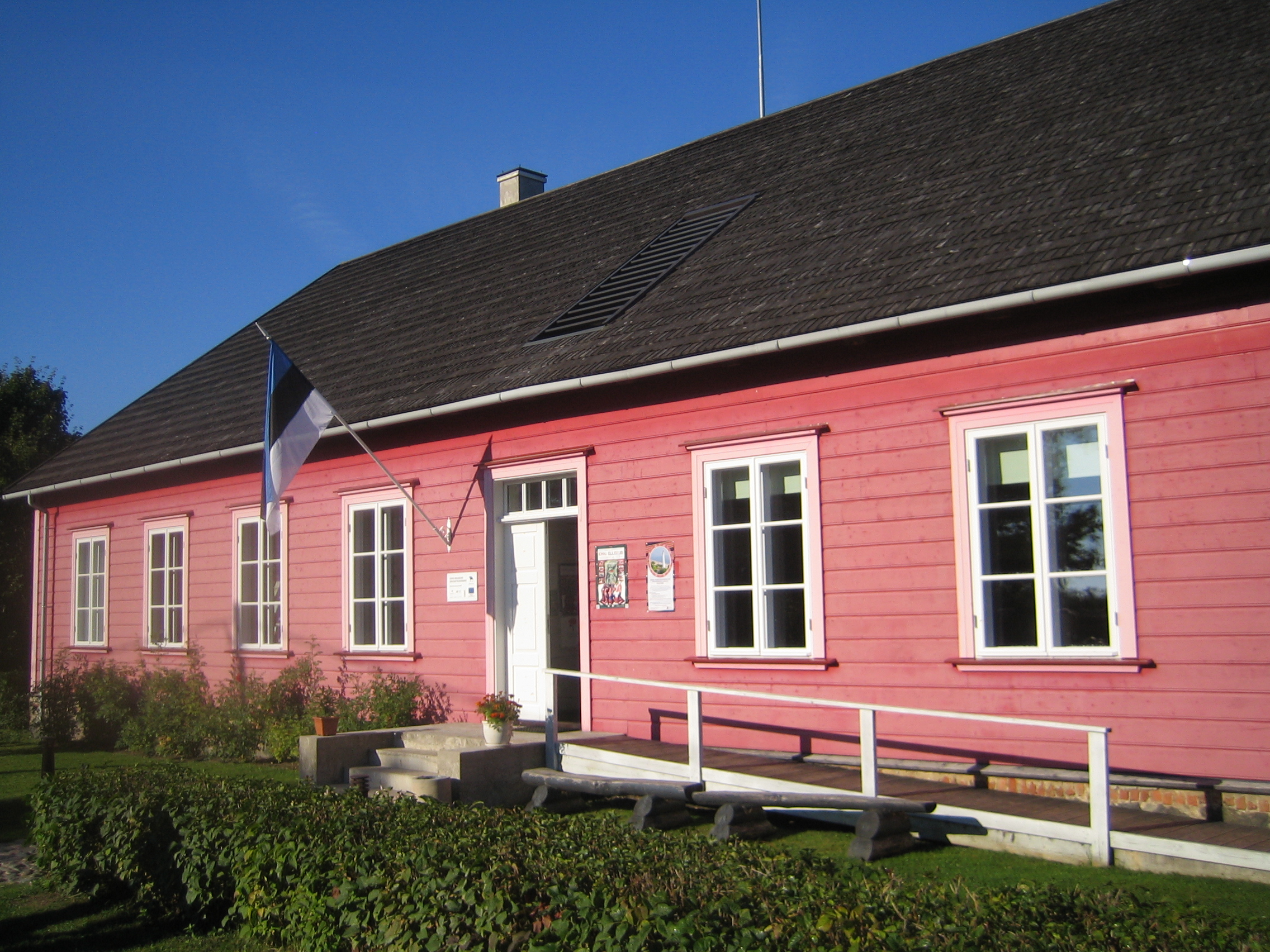
Museum

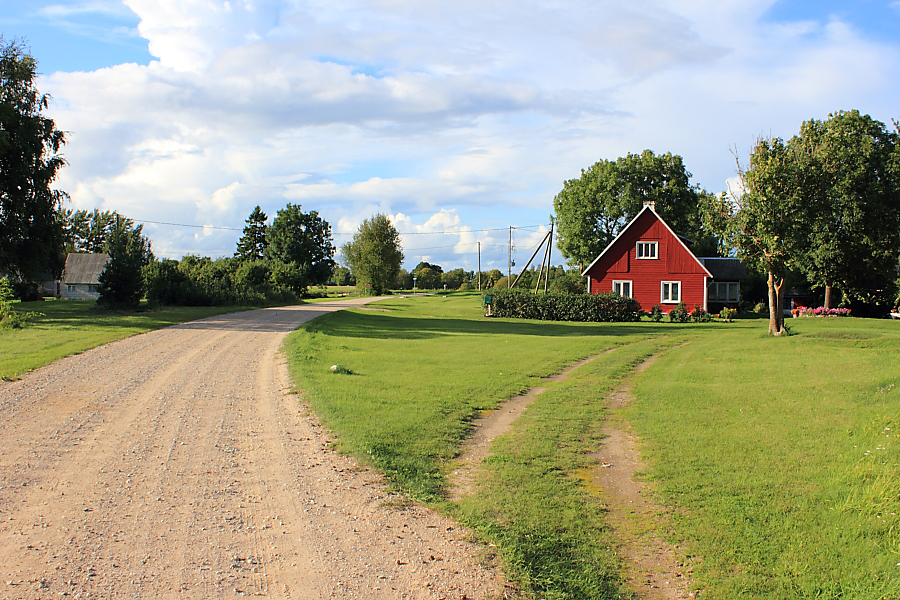
Village road

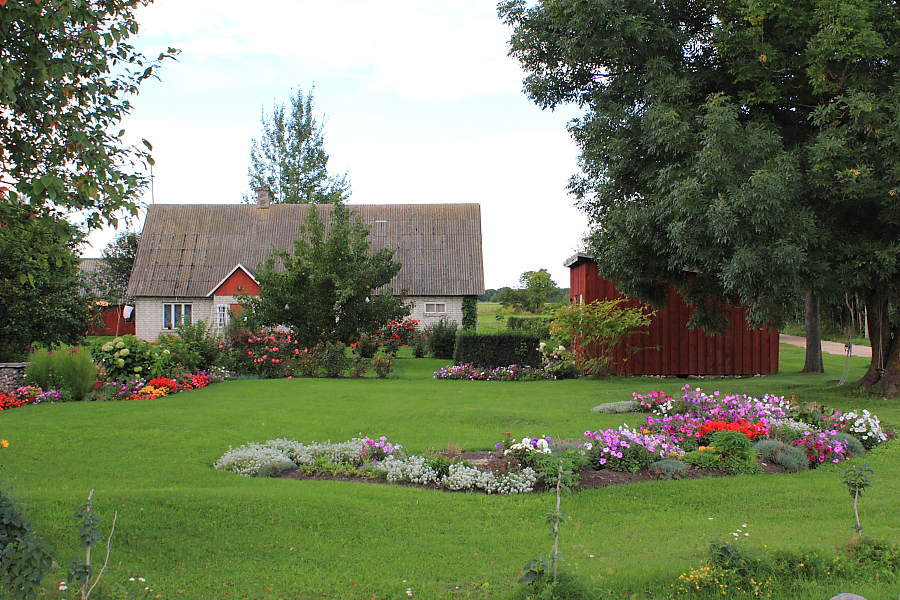
Garden

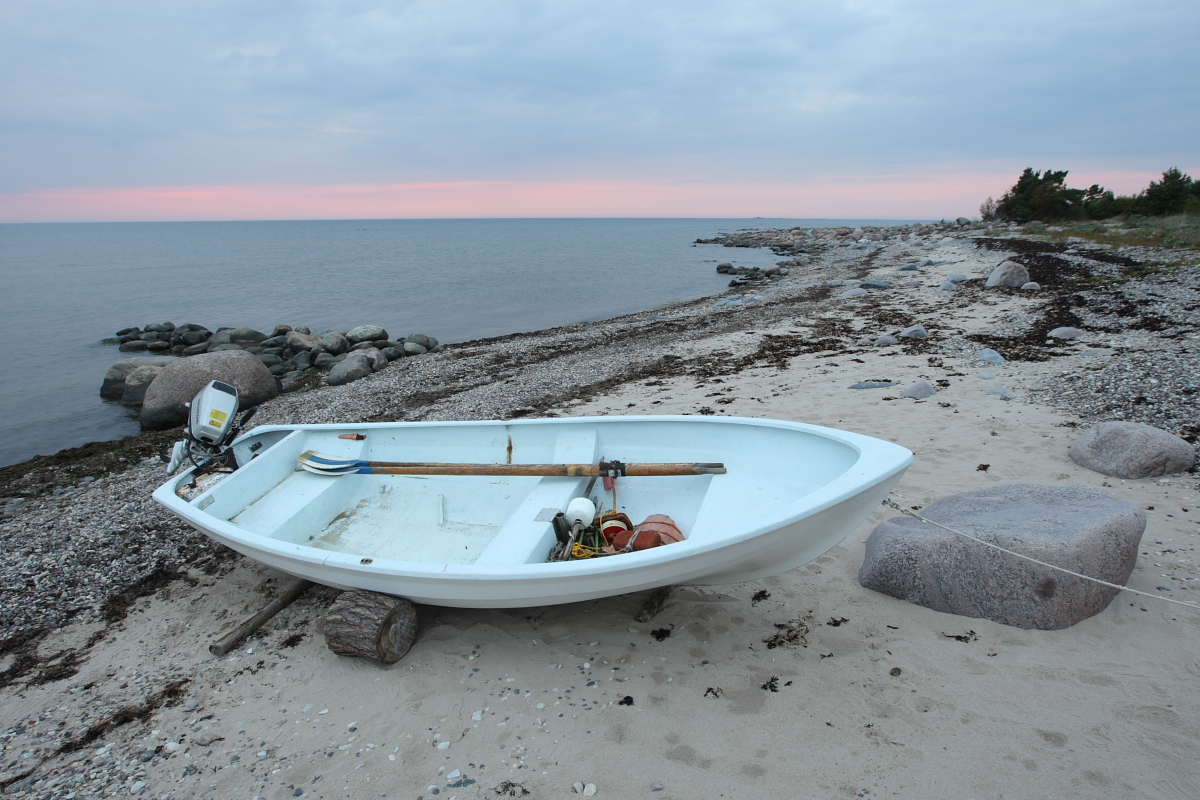
A view of the coastline

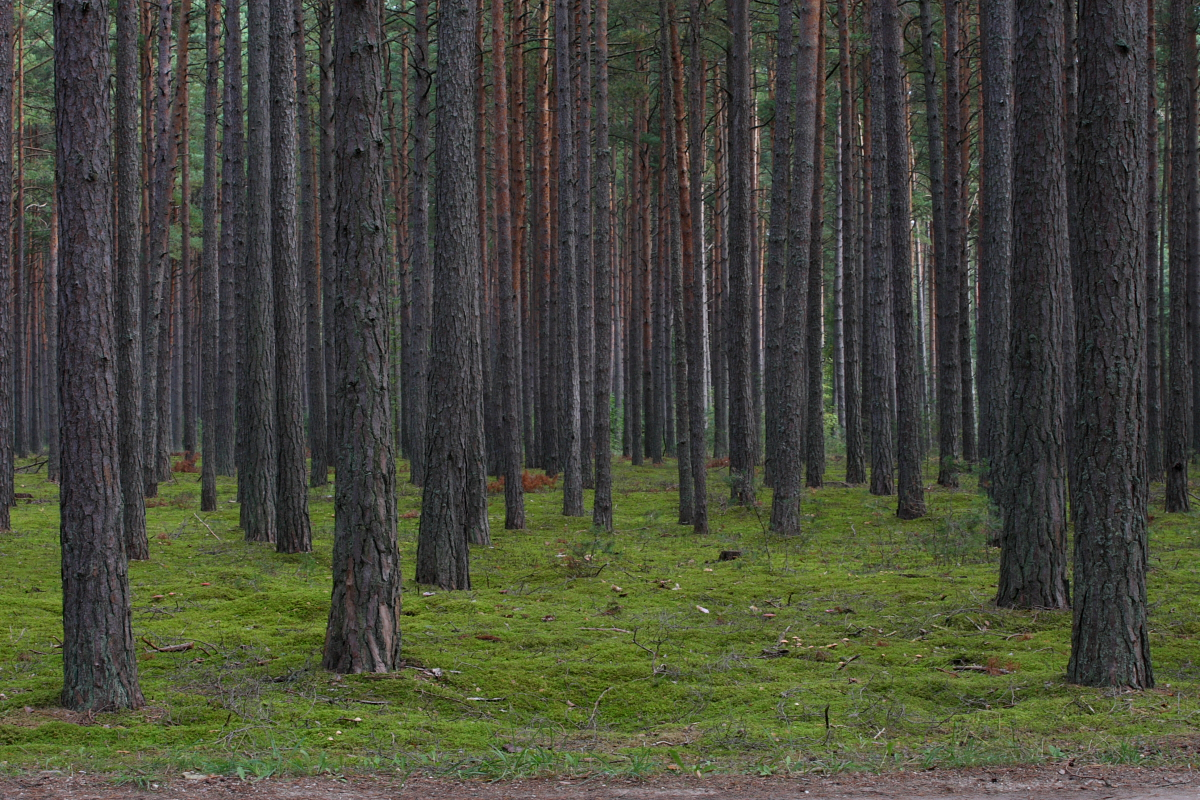
Pine forest

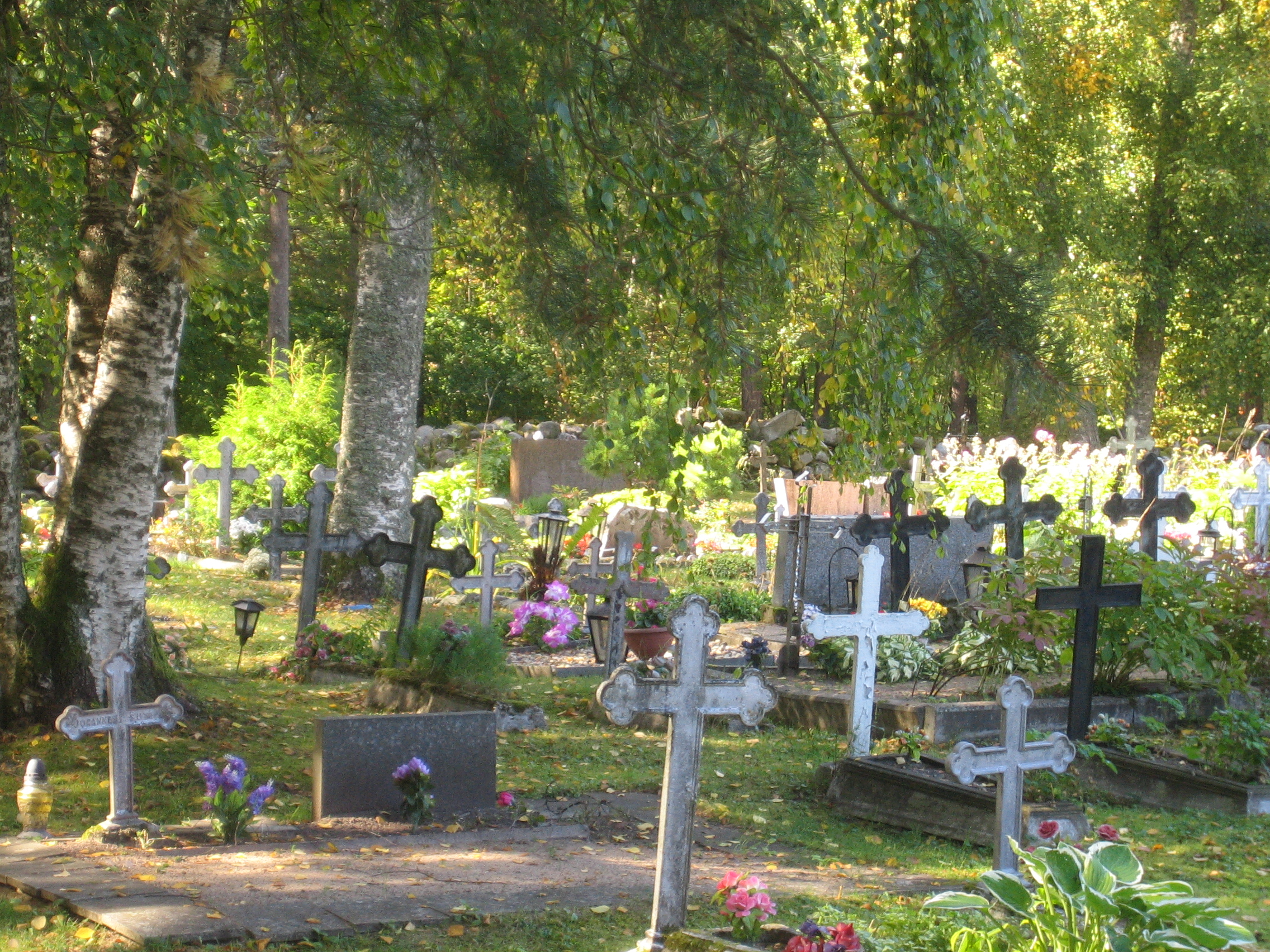
Cemetery

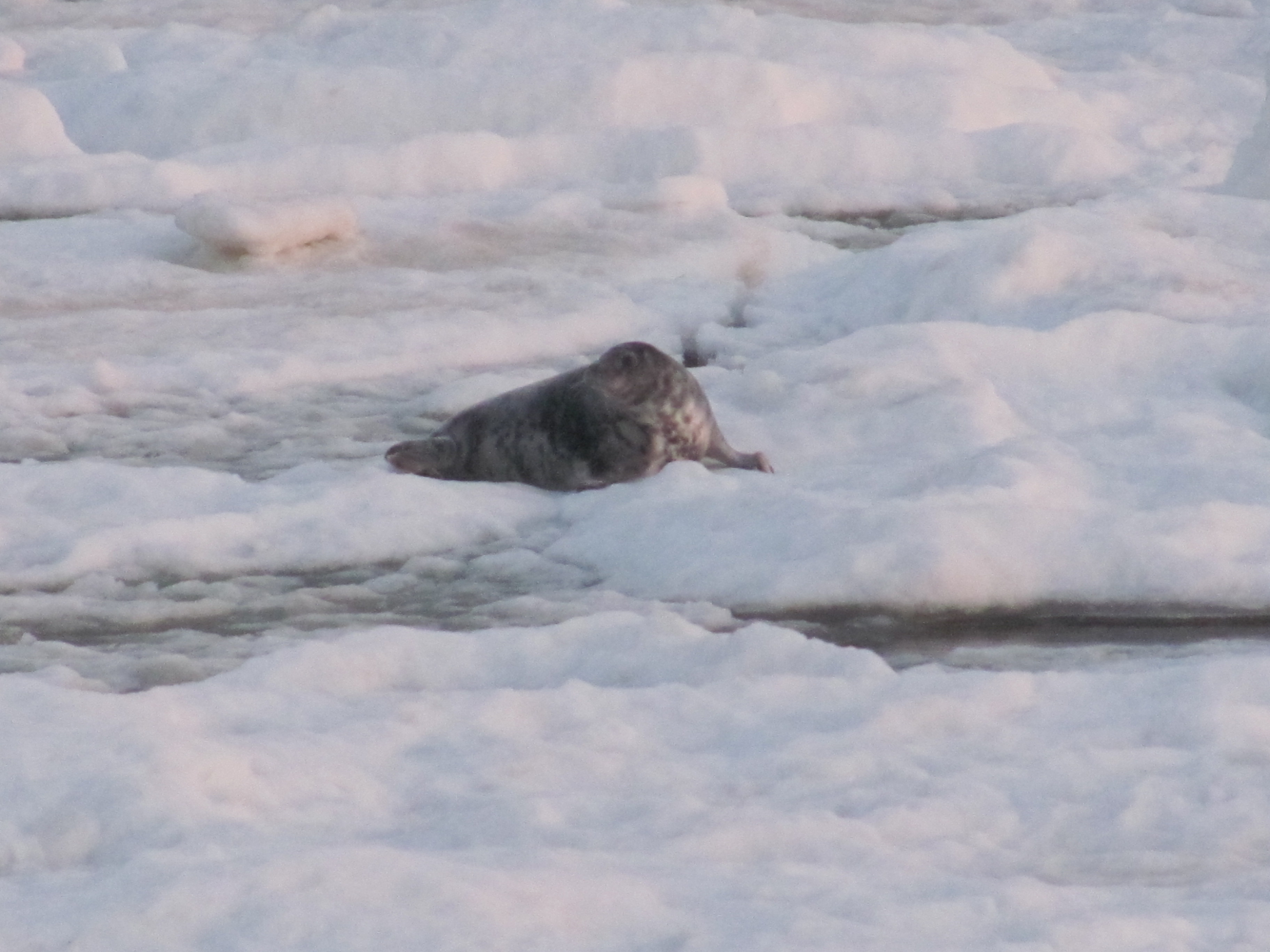
An adult grey seal on drift ice just off of the Kihnu coast

A bird's eye view of part of Kihnu island

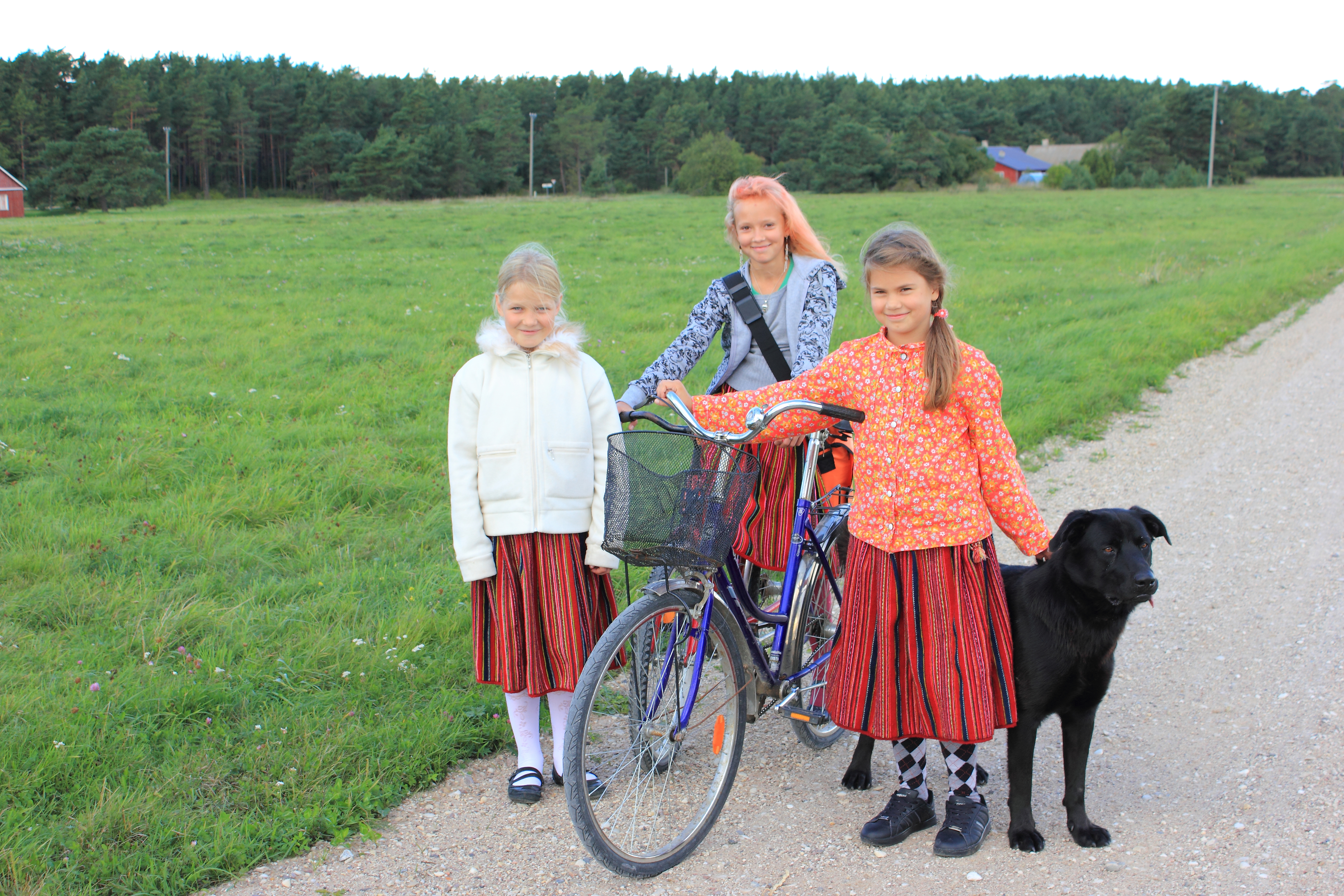
Young girls in both modern and traditional dress returning from school

== See also ==
- List of islands of Estonia
