= Enn Uuetoa =

Estonian sea captain

Enn Uuetoa (also known as Kihnu Jõnn; 1848–1913) was ship captain from Estonia.

Uuetoa was born on the island of Kihnu. He was known as a ship captain who was able to command large ships without the use of either a compass or a sextant. He never had a single accident with his ships. He also used to go to the sea when other captains didn't dare to go.

However, in autumn 1913 he sunk with his ship called Rock City when sailing off the coast of Denmark.

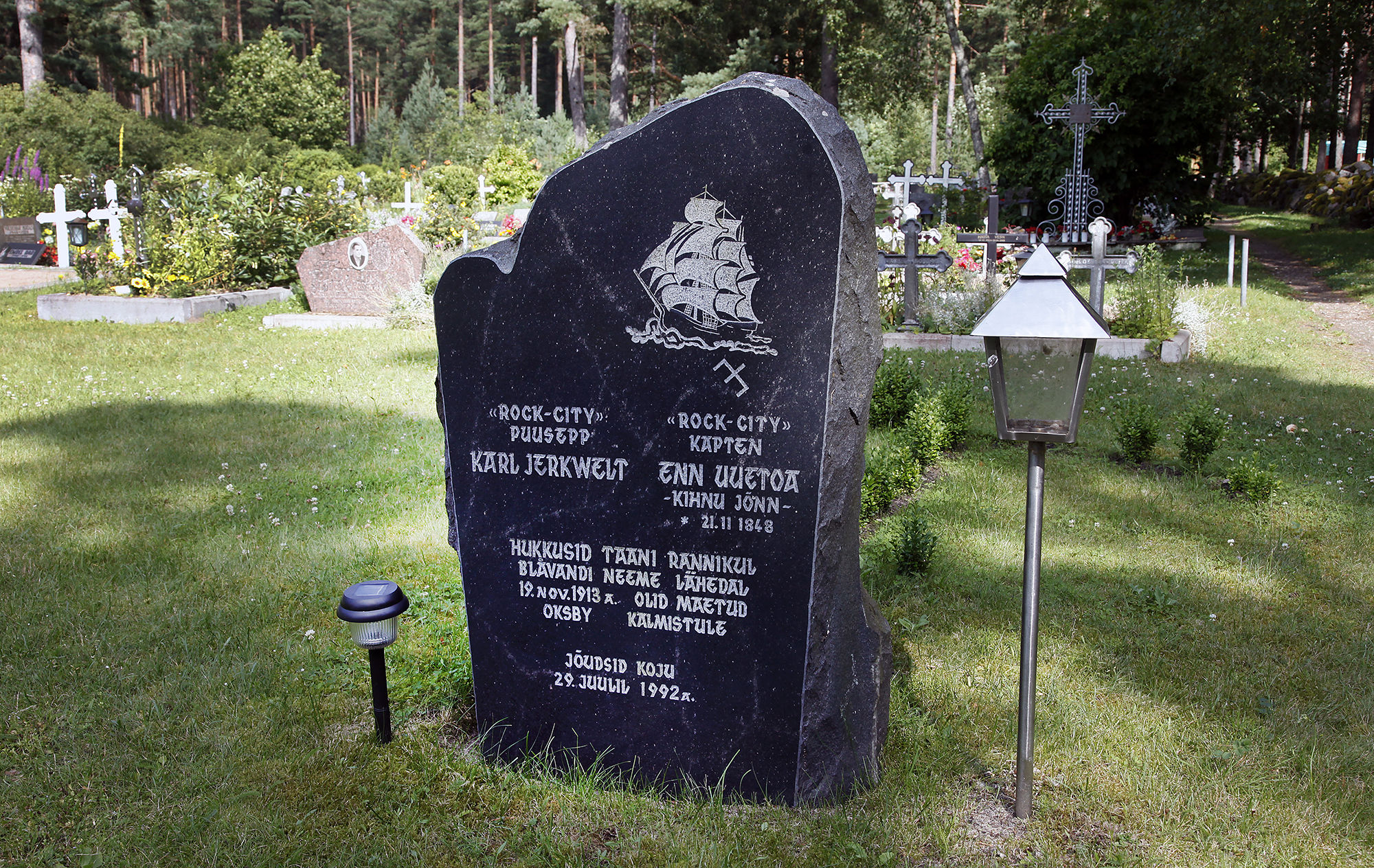
Grave of Enn Uuetoa in Kihnu Cemetery

== In popular culture ==
In 1971, the film Metskapten (director Kalju Komissarov) was made. The role of Kihnu Jõnn was played by Jüri Järvet.
