= Kirov Collective Fishing Farm =

Collective farm in Estonia (1950–1991)

Coordinates: 59°26′09.0″N 24°44′21.7″E

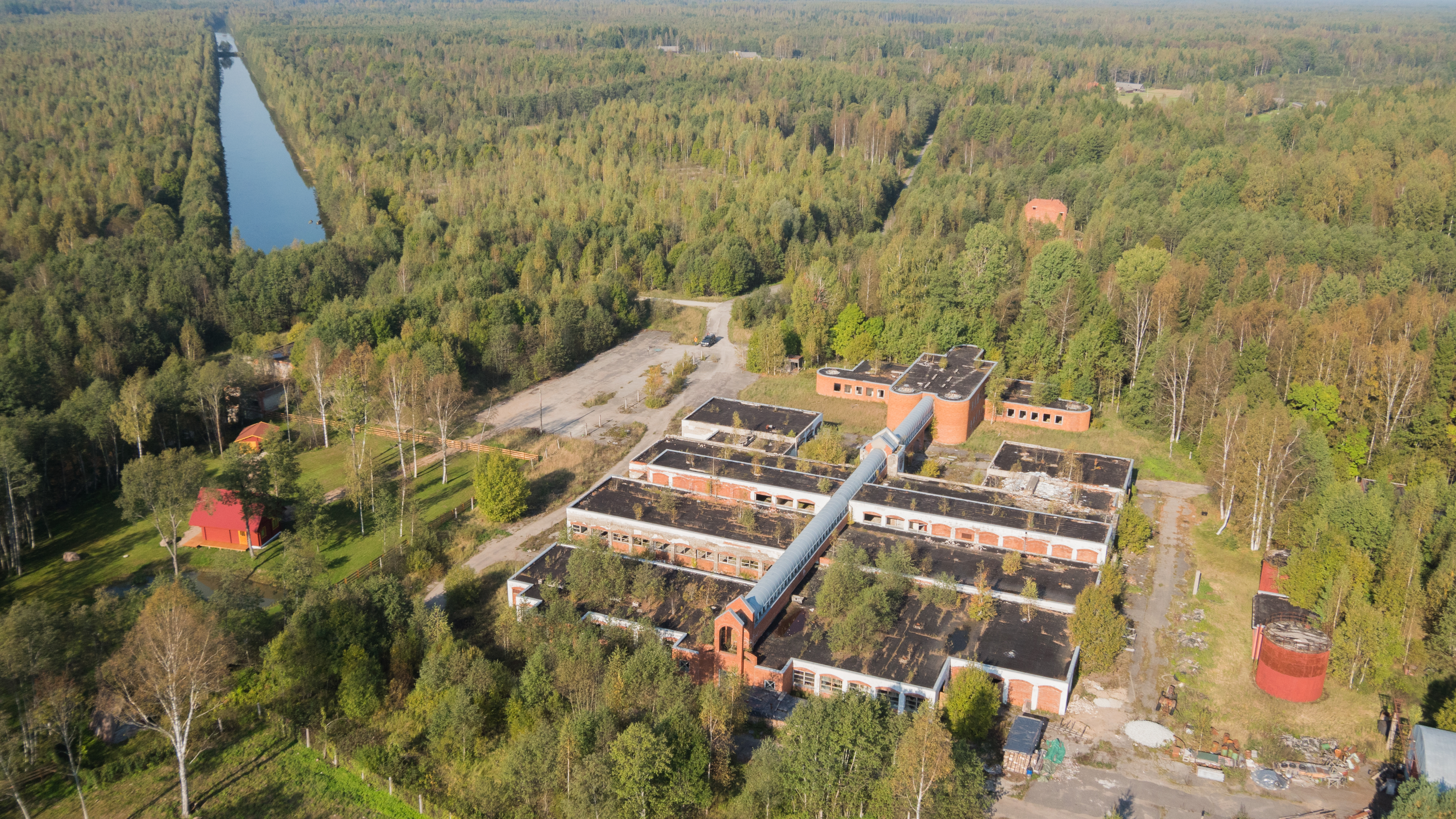
- Ruins of the artificial caviar plant in Omedu
- Predecessors: Põhjakalur, Randlase, Forell, and Murdlaine collective farms
- Founded: August 12, 1950
- Defunct: 1991
- Products: Fish products, canned fish, consumer goods

The Kirov Collective Fishing Farm (officially S. M. Kirov Model Collective Fishery, Estonian: S. Kirovi nimeline näidiskalurikolhoos, Russian: Опорно-показательный рыболовецкий колхоз имени С. М. Кирова) was a collective farm (kolkhoz) dedicated to fishing activity in Haabneeme, Harju County, Estonia.

== History ==
In December 1946, the Põhjakalur collective farm—the first artel on the Viimsi Peninsula–was formed in the village of Rohuneeme in Harju County. In the atmosphere of fear caused by the deportations in March 1949, several more collective farms were created in Viimsi Parish: the Randlase collective farm in Tammneeme, the Forelli collective farm in Miiduranna, and the Murdlaine collective farm in Leppneeme. On August 12, 1950, when the four collective farms merged, a collective farm for fishing was created based at the school in Viimsi. The collective farm was named after the Russian Bolshevik Sergei Kirov.

By the end of the 1950s, the collective farm had 48 large trawlers and over 50 small trawlers. It became a fishing industry in 1959, when the first smoking facility was built in Leppneeme. Soon, similar plants also appeared in Rohuneeme, Haabneeme, Prangli, and Kakumäe. In 1965, the production of preserved fish began, and in 1966 the USSR's first cannery for a collective fishing farm was opened in Viimsi. Smoking and canning plants appeared on the ever-expanding territory of the collective farm, as well as cold storage facilities.

Ships and machines in need of repair were serviced at the mechanical plant, as well as equipment for the fishing industry and fish farming; Estonia's first fully mechanized fish-processing line was also manufactured there. The packaging plant produced cans for the fishing industry, and the equipment plant made and repaired fishing gear. In addition, the farm operated its own wood plant and construction and repair service. In the 1960s, fur breeding was also carried out.

In the second half of the 1970s, fish farms were established in Käruveski, Pärispea, Hara, Valgejõe, and Roosna-Alliku. In the 1980s, a large modern fish farm was established at the Omedu collective farm near Lake Peipus, along with an artificial caviar plant. The Kirov Collective Fishing Farm even participated in the large fishing industry of the Far East.

From 1961 to1976, new collective fishing farms were merged with the Kirov collective farm: in 1961 Noor Kaardivägi on Prangli, in 1962 Kalur in Kakumäe, in 1968 the Sõprus collective fishing farm in Neeme, in 1971 Võidu Tee and Lohusalu Nord in Viinistu, in 1972 Oktoober in Kaberneeme, and in 1976 the Gorki collective fishing farm operating in the Rakvere district. In other words, from Tallinn to just beyond Kunda, the entire northern coast of Estonia, together with the nearby islands, was in the hands of the Kirov Collective Fishing Farm. In addition, another holding was in Omedu on Lake Peipus in Mustvee Parish. In total, the collective farm covered the territory of 27 former small estates.

In parallel, separate auxiliary farms and production units were developed, from a unit manufacturing hats to the farm's own souvenir shop. In addition, it produced aluminum mugs and shampoo for the military. In 1973, a winter garden was completed in Pringi. In 1978, a commercial outlet for the collective farm with a flower shop was opened in Tallinn on Pärnu Street (Pärnu maantee) near Victory Square (Võidu väljak). A few years later, a fish grill bar was opened on the basement floor there, and a small hotel was opened on the upper floors of the building (in the early 1990s, a Westman grocery store started operating in the same building).

In the late 1970s and early 1980s, the collective farm received its own garden, a dairy herd, and pig, sheep, and chicken farms. In 1980, the 30th anniversary of the founding of the collective farm was celebrated. For this occasion, the Viimsi Open Air Museum was opened in the village of Pringi. In addition, the Kirov Collective Fishing Farm was awarded the Order of the Red Banner of Labor. At the beginning of 1985, the poorly performing Kahala agricultural state farm (centered at Kolgu Manor) in today's Kuusalu Parish was merged with the collective fishing farm.

In 1990, the members of the collective farm founded the limited company Esmar, which was reorganized into a joint-stock company with the same name at a shareholders' meeting held in April 1993.

The buildings of the operation located in Viinistu were purchased by Jaan Manitski in the 1990s, and today the Viinistu Art Museum is located there.

The history of the collective farm is presented at the Museum of Coastal Folk in Pringi.

== Chairmen of the collective farm ==
- Paul Alliksoo (1916–1968) from 1950 to 1952
- Albert Saluneem (1908–1965) from 1952 to 1955
- Oskar Kuul (1924–1992) from 1955 to 1990
- Kaljo Visnapuu (1948–1999) managed the farm and Esmar from 1990 to 1999
