= Oskar Kuul =

Estonian manager (1924–1992)

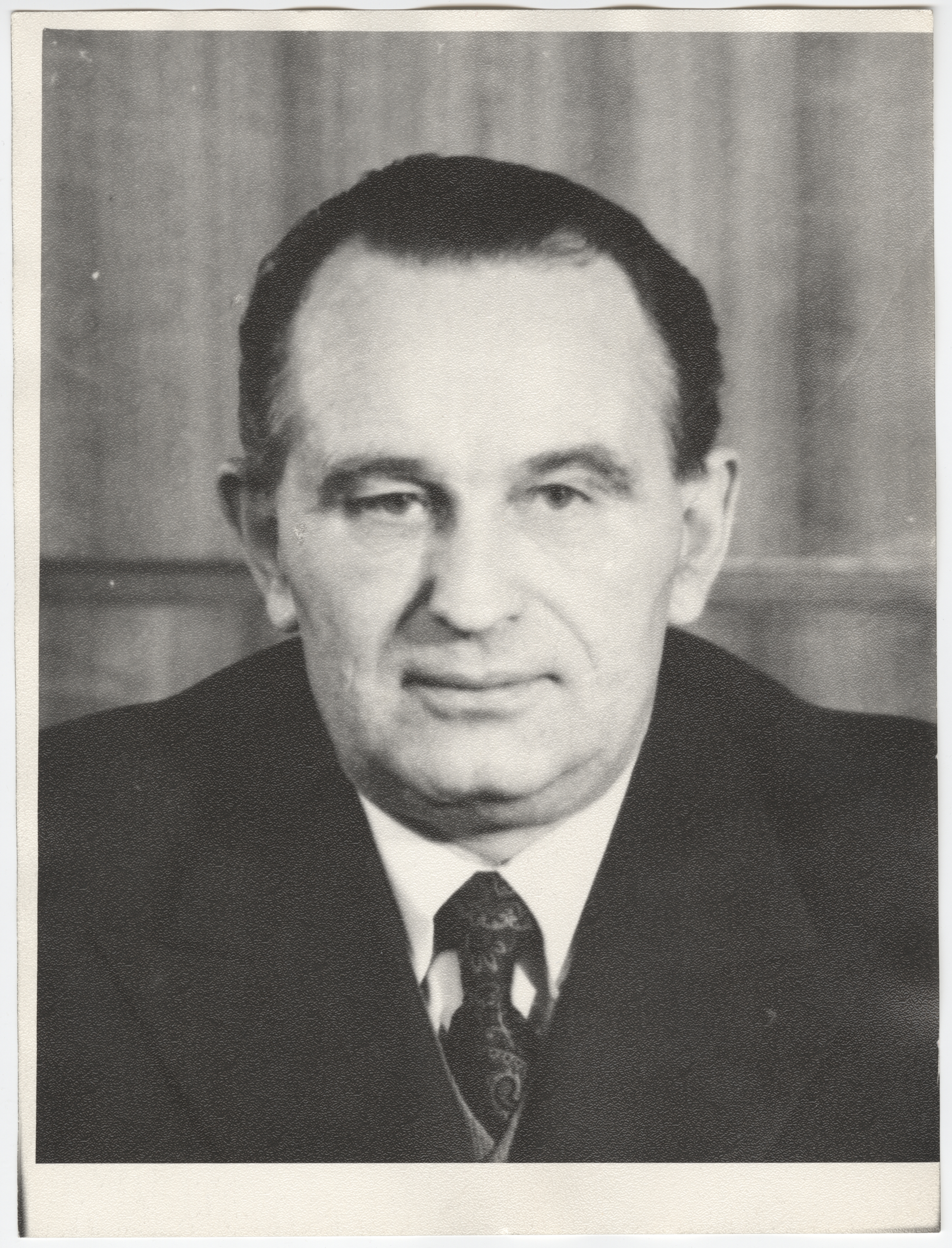
- Born: November 6, 1924; Lileika, Sedelnikovsky District, Omsk Oblast, USSR
- Died: December 10, 1992 (aged 68)
- Occupation: Collective farm manager

Oskar Kuul (November 6, 1924 – December 10, 1992) was an Estonian collective farm manager. He was the chairman of the Kirov Collective Fishing Farm from 1955 to 1990.

== Early life and training ==
Oskar Kuul was born in the Estonian settlement of Lileika near Omsk in Siberia. He served in the Red Army during the Second World War. In 1945, he was an NKGB agent in Narva. From 1946 to 1949, he worked as a Komsomol leader in Lihula and Haapsalu. From 1949 to 1951, he studied at the KGB Officers' School in Vilnius, and he then worked in the KGB of the Estonian SSR, from which he was sent to the active reserve in 1955 with the rank of senior lieutenant.

== Career ==
From December 22, 1955, to July 20, 1990, Kuul was the chairman of the Kirov Collective Fishing Farm.

== Awards and recognitions ==
Kuul received many awards of the USSR, the most important of which were the Gold Star of the Hero of Socialist Labor (1980) and two Orders of Lenin. In 1987, he was awarded the USSR State Prize.

== Legacy ==
Reidikai, also named Kuuli Muna after Kuul, is a ship refueling building in Tallinn Bay near Miiduranna.

A monument dedicated to Kuul by the sculptor Seaküla Simson was installed in Haabneeme in Viimsi Parish in 2008.
