= Museum of Coastal Folk Foundation =

Museum foundation in Lõunaküla, Estonia

- Sihtasutus Rannarahva Muuseum
- Location: Pringi, Harju County, Estonia
- Coordinates: 59°31′16″N 24°48′29″E
- Parking: On site
- Website: rannarahvamuuseum.ee/muuseumid/

The Museum of Coastal Folk Foundation (Estonian: Sihtasutus Rannarahva Muuseum)—previously known as the Viimsi Museum Foundation (Estonian: Sihtasutus Viimsi Muuseumid)—is a foundation that manages three museums: the Viimsi Open Air Museum, the Museum of Coastal Folk, and the Naissaar Museum.

The predecessor of the Museum of Coastal Folk Foundation is the Kirov Collective Fishing Farm Museum, which was founded in 1971. The open-air department of the museum was opened in the village of Pringi in 1980. In its present form, the museum was created after several reorganizations in June 2007, when the Viimsi Museum Foundation was created. In the fall of 2009, the institution was renamed the Museum of Coastal Folk Foundation because the new name better reflected the work and history of the museum.

The three museums managed by the foundation complement each other, offering a broader picture of the life of Estonian coastal people. The Museum of Coastal Folk covers coastal people on the shores of the Baltic Sea from ancient times to the present day, the Viimsi Open Air Museum tells the story of the fishing village, and the Naissaar Museum presents coastal people on small islands and military history. The foundation acts as a memory institution for the people of the coast, collecting and exhibiting the cultural and historical heritage of the people of the coast in its museums.
