= Neeme =

Neeme may refer to:

- Neeme, Harju County, village in Jõelähtme Parish, Harju County
- Neeme, Saare County, village in Kihelkonna Parish, Saare County
- Neeme (given name), Estonian masculine given name
