= Pringi =

Pringi may refer to several places in Estonia:

- Pringi, Harju County, village in Viimsi Parish, Harju County
- Pringi, Valga County, village in Sangaste Parish, Valga County
