= Reidikai =

Structure in Tallinn Bay, Estonia

Coordinates: 59.4959°N 24.800826°E

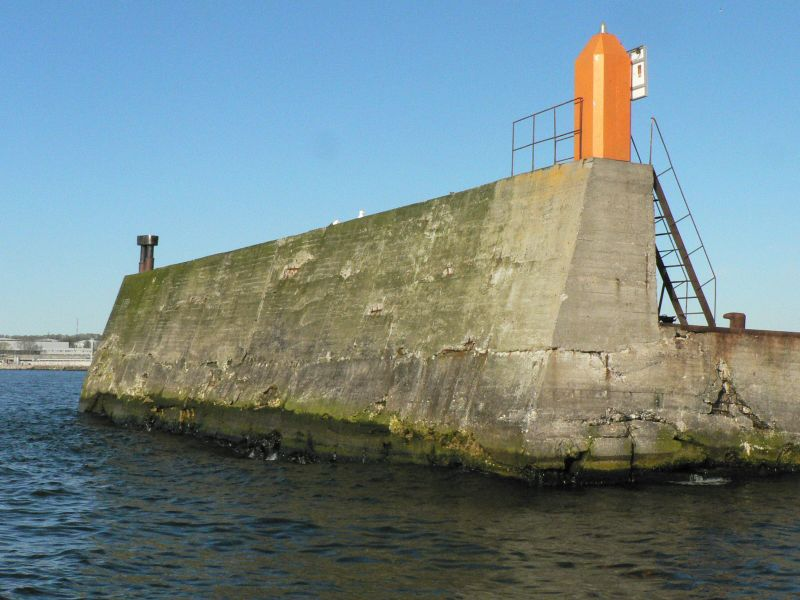
Reidikai

Reidikai (Roadstead Quay, from Estonian reid 'roadstead' and kai 'quay'), also known as Kuuli Muna (lit. 'Kuul's Egg'), is a structure located in Tallinn Bay, Estonia, 800 m west of Miiduranna Harbor. It is a concrete building that was built in the late 1960s for refueling ships and submarines.

The name Kuuli Muna refers to Oskar Kuul, the chairman of the Kirov Collective Fishing Farm, which owned property in the area. Currently, Reidikai is abandoned, used by divers, and used for picnics by the sea. The water depth around Reidikai is 10 to 13 meters (33 to 43 ft). From Reidikai, pipelines on the seabed lead to the Viimsi oil storage facility.
