= Museum of Coastal Folk =

Museum in Pringi, Estonia

- Rannarahva Muuseum
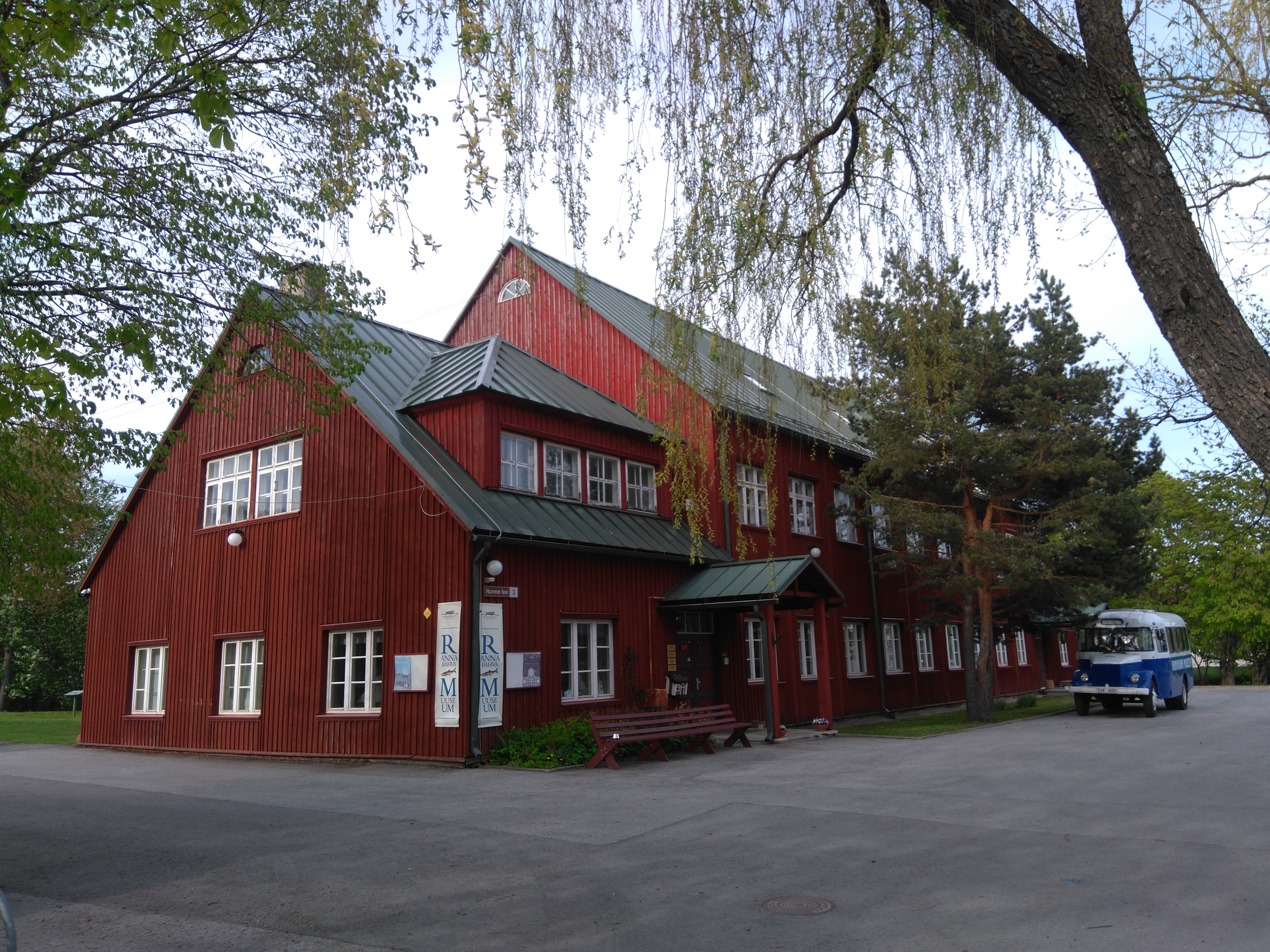
- Location: Pringi, Harju County, Estonia
- Coordinates: 59°31′16″N 24°48′29″E
- Type: Folk museum
- Parking: On site
- Website: rannarahvamuuseum.ee/en/museum-of-coastal-folk/

The Museum of Coastal Folk (Estonian: Rannarahva Muuseum) is a museum located in Pringi, Viimsi Parish, in northern Estonia.

The museum is a branch of the Museum of Coastal Folk Foundation. The activities and displays of the museum are related to the life of Estonian coastal people in the past and today. Among the most important topics it covers are the Kirov Collective Fishing Farm and the small islands of northern Estonia, as well as modern fishing.

The director of the museum is Janek Šafranovski.
