= Viimsi Open Air Museum =

Museum in Pringi, Estonia

- Viimsi vabaõhumuuseum
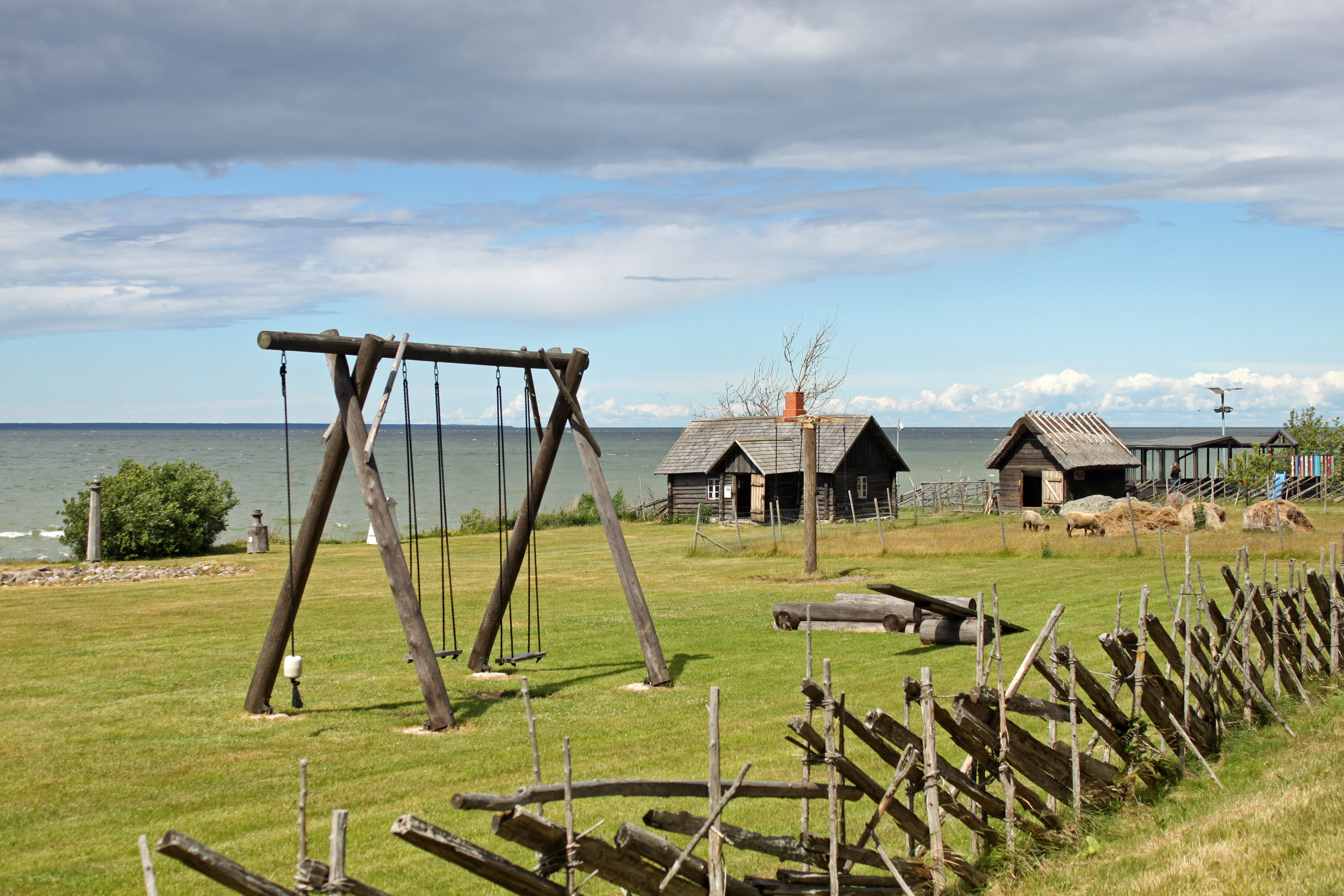
- The Viimsi Open Air Museum
- Location: Pringi, Harju County, Estonia
- Coordinates: 59°31′28″N 24°47′53″E
- Type: Folk museum
- Parking: On site
- Website: rannarahvamuuseum.ee/en/viimsi-open-air-museum/

The Viimsi Open Air Museum (Estonian: Viimsi vabaõhumuuseum) is an open-air museum located in Viimsi Parish in northern Estonia.

The museum is a branch of the Museum of Coastal Folk Foundation. It consists of buildings from the Kingu beach farm built in the 1820s: a shed, a house, a barn, and other farm buildings.
