= Liivakari =

Island in Estonia

Coordinates: 59°27′51.42″N 24°34′26.37″E

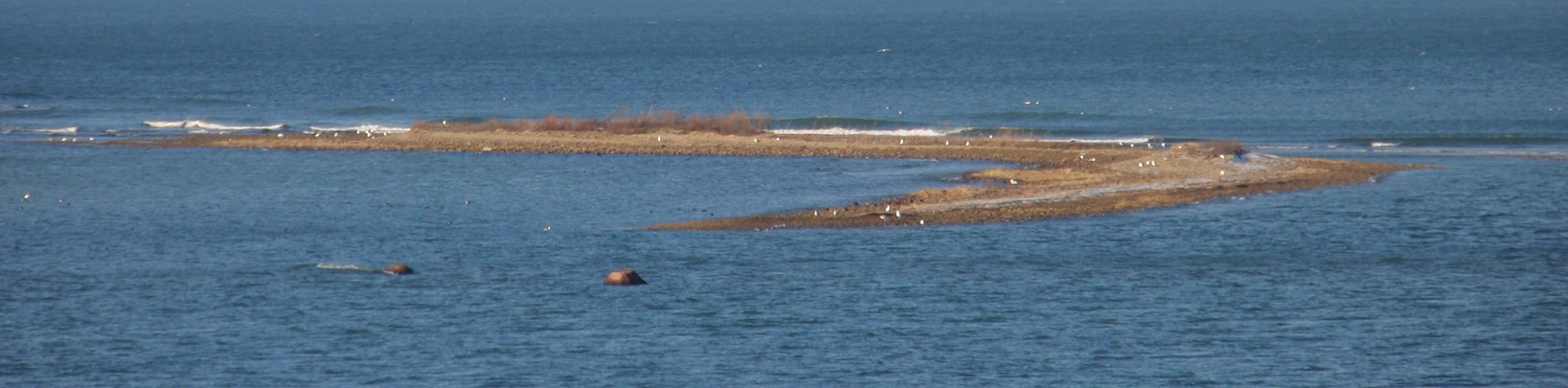
Liivakari

Liivakari is an island belonging to the country of Estonia.Liivakari is located next to Kakumäe.

== Description ==
Liivakari is Estonian for sand flock. The island, 0.4 km long and 740 m in circumference, covers an area of one hectare. It lies to the north of the Kakumäe peninsula, in a shallow area of Kopli Bay. The island forms narrow, elongated diverticula with a sandy substrate and no significant vegetation; it is located a few hundred meters from the coast in the extension of the peninsula.

Administratively, it comes under the Haabersti district (Kakumäe district), west of Tallinn, one of the eight districts of Estonia's capital.

== See also ==
- List of islands of Estonia
