= Naissaar Museum =

Museum in Lõunaküla, Estonia

- Naissaare Muuseum
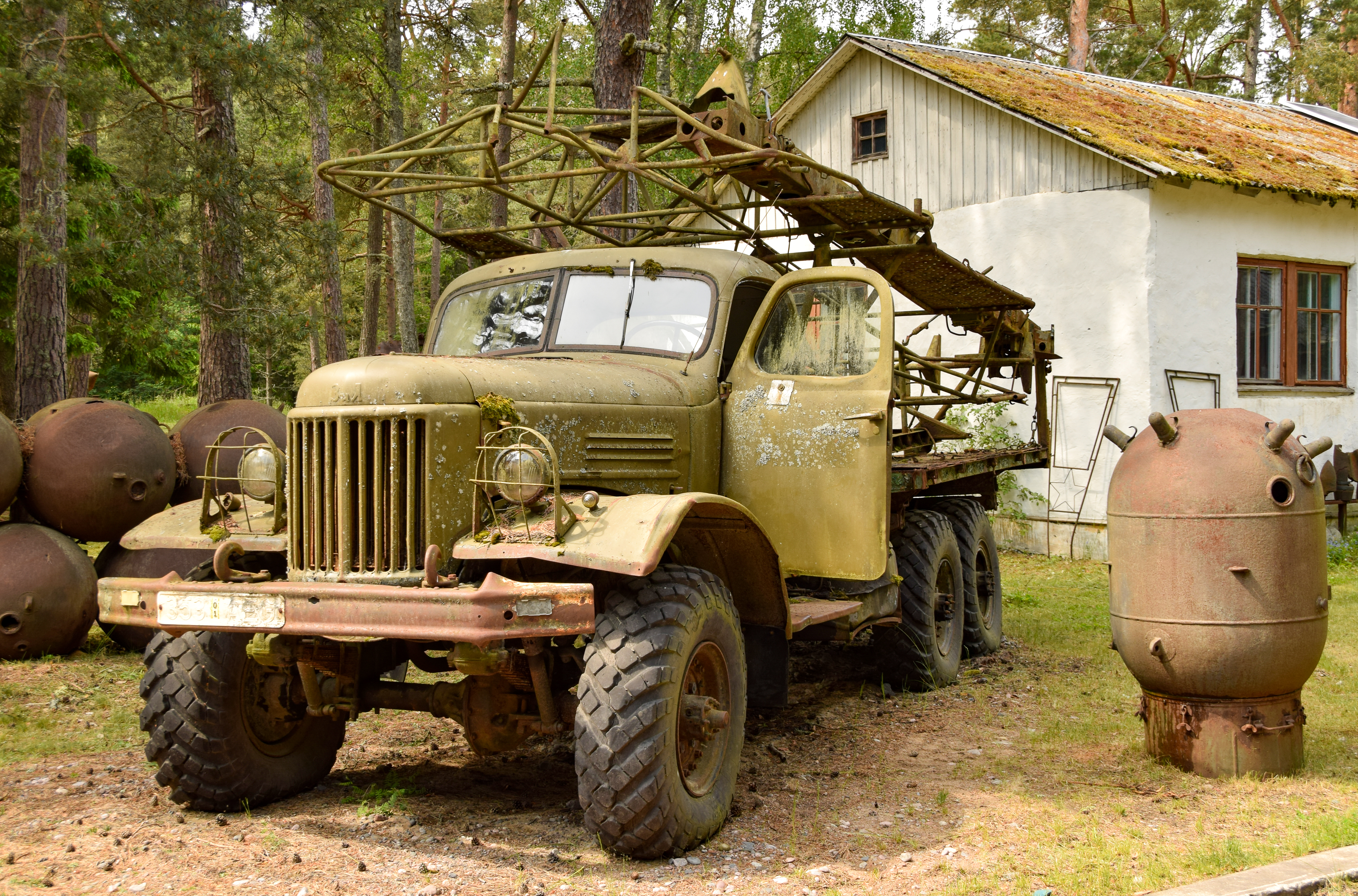
- Location: Lõunaküla, Harju County, Estonia
- Coordinates: 59°32′36″N 24°32′52″E
- Type: Military museum
- Parking: On site
- Website: rannarahvamuuseum.ee/en/naissaare-muuseum-eng/

The Naissaar Museum (Estonian: Naissaare Muuseum) is a museum located on the island of Naissaar in Estonia that presents the military history of the island. The museum offers an insight into the period when Naissaar was a closed military zone and explains the island’s role in the defence system of the Gulf of Tallinn.

The museum is a branch of the Museum of Coastal Folk Foundation. The museum is located in the old Männiku barracks, which were used until the late 1980s to house Soviet military servicemen, now part of the village of Lõunaküla.
