= Neeme (given name) =

Estonian male given name

- Gender: Male
- Language: Estonian

Origin
- Region of origin: Estonia

Neeme is an Estonian-language male given name.

People named Neeme include:

- Neeme Järvi (born 1937), conductor
- Neeme Ruus (1911–1942), politician
- Neeme Suur (born 1968), politician
- Neeme Väli (born 1965), Major General of the Estonian Defence League
