= Tammneeme =

Village in Estonia

- village
- Location in Estonia
- Coordinates: 59°31′40″N 24°53′40″E
- Country: Estonia
- County: Harju County
- Municipality: Viimsi Parish
- First mentioned: 1491

Population (2011 Census)
  - Total: 463

Drone video of Tammneeme village

Tammneeme is a village in Viimsi Parish, Harju County in northern Estonia. It is located about 13 km (8 mi) northeast of the centre of Tallinn, on the eastern coast of Viimsi peninsula by the Muuga Bay. As of the 2011 census, the settlement's population was 463.

Tammneeme was first mentioned in 1491 as Iversback. During the Middle Ages, Tammneeme was settled by Coastal Swedes and belonged to Maardu Manor. At the beginning of 16th century, the first Estonians started to settle there, and they slowly predominated. Most of today's housing was built in the 1960s and 1970s.

The composer and musician Arved Haug (1922–1995) was born in Tammneeme.

== Gallery ==
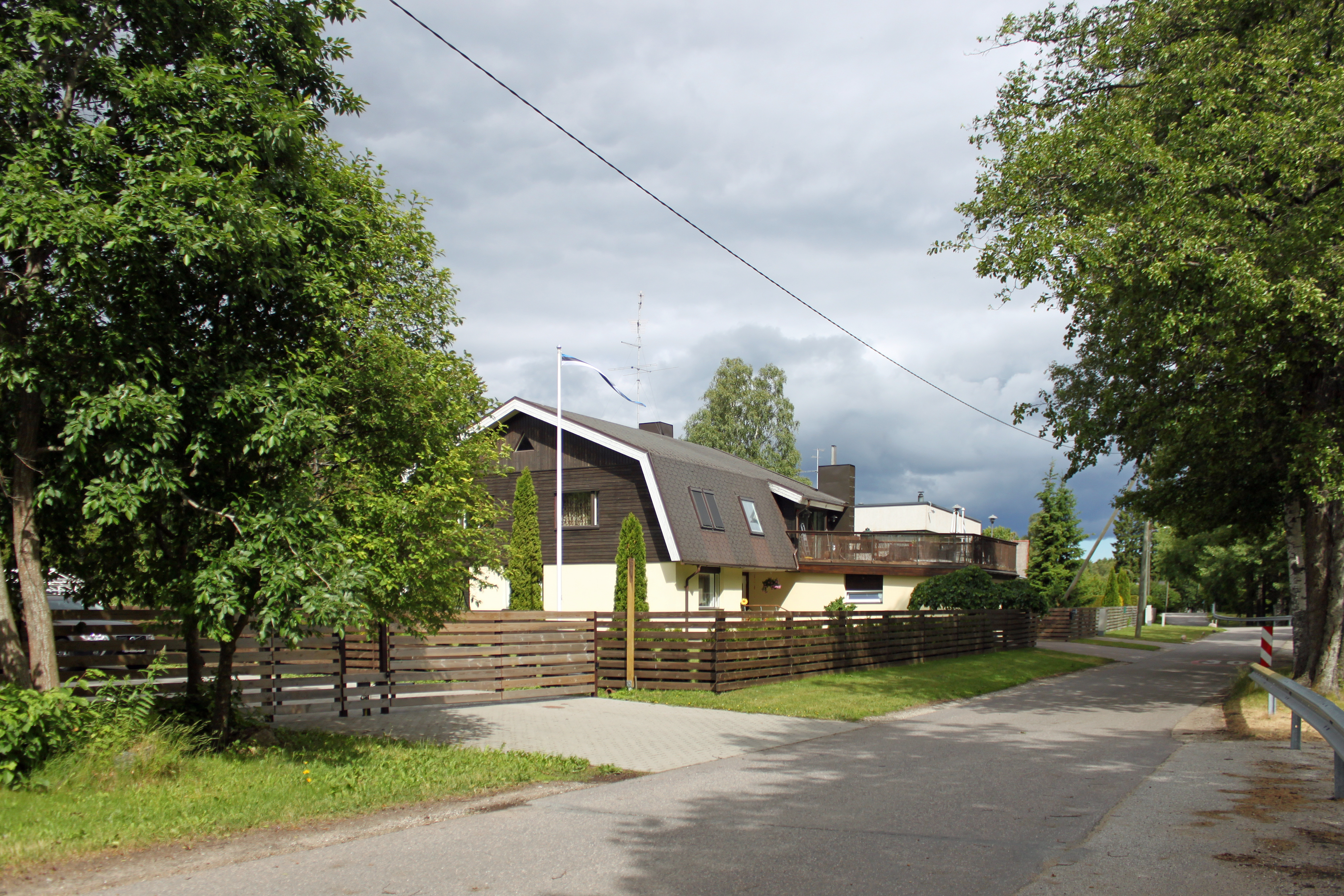
Street in Tammneeme.

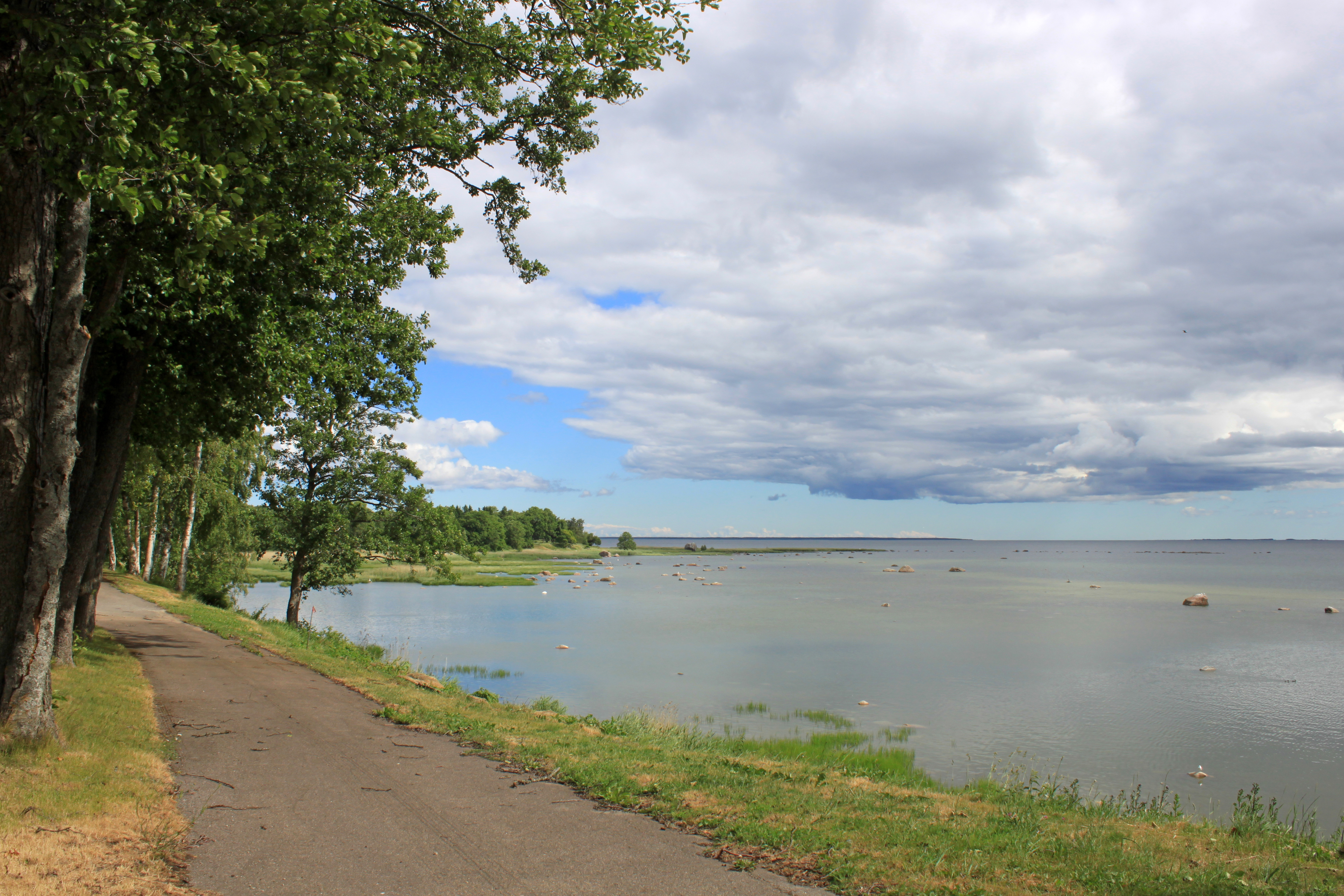
The coast at Tammneeme.

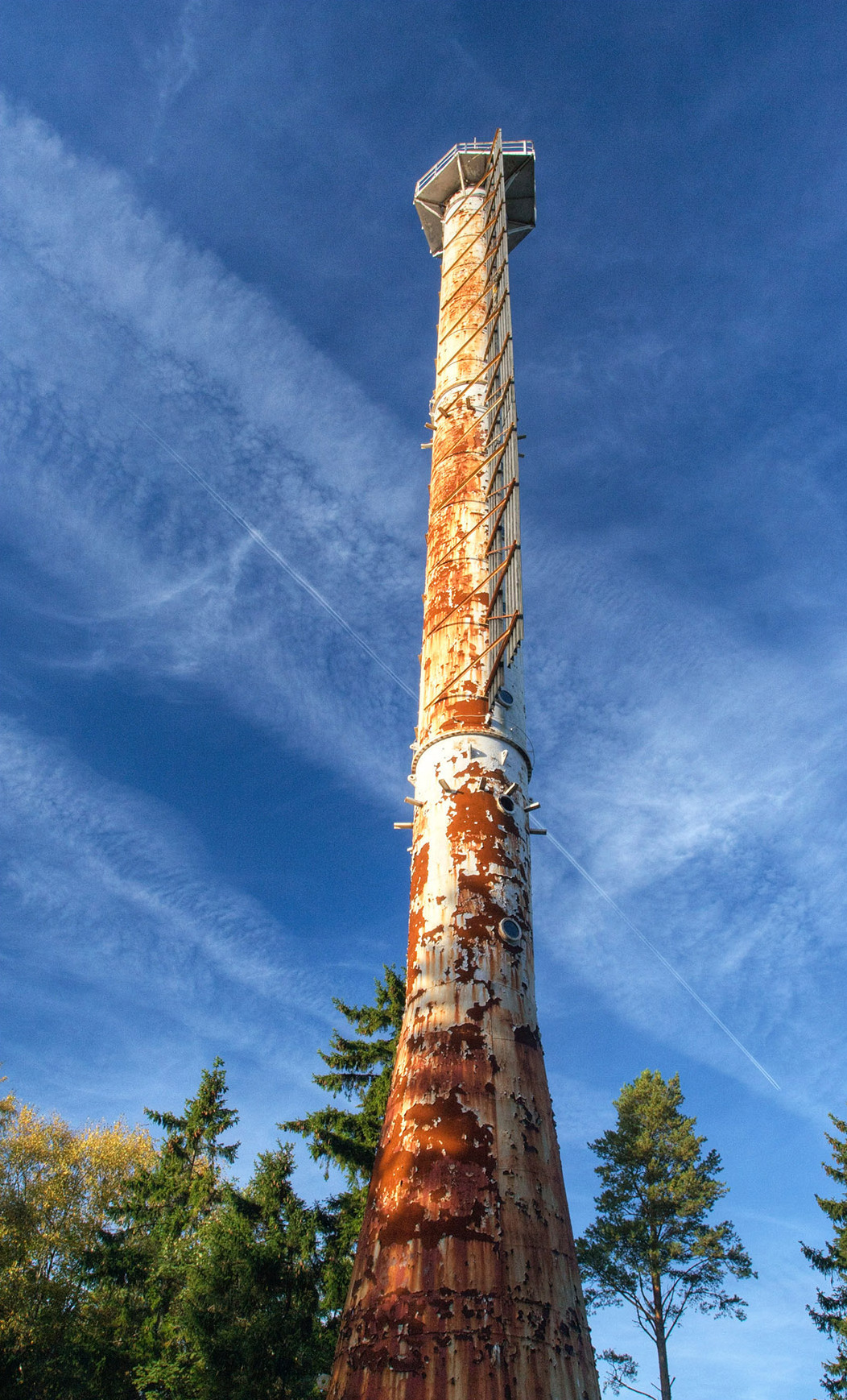
Former lighthouse.

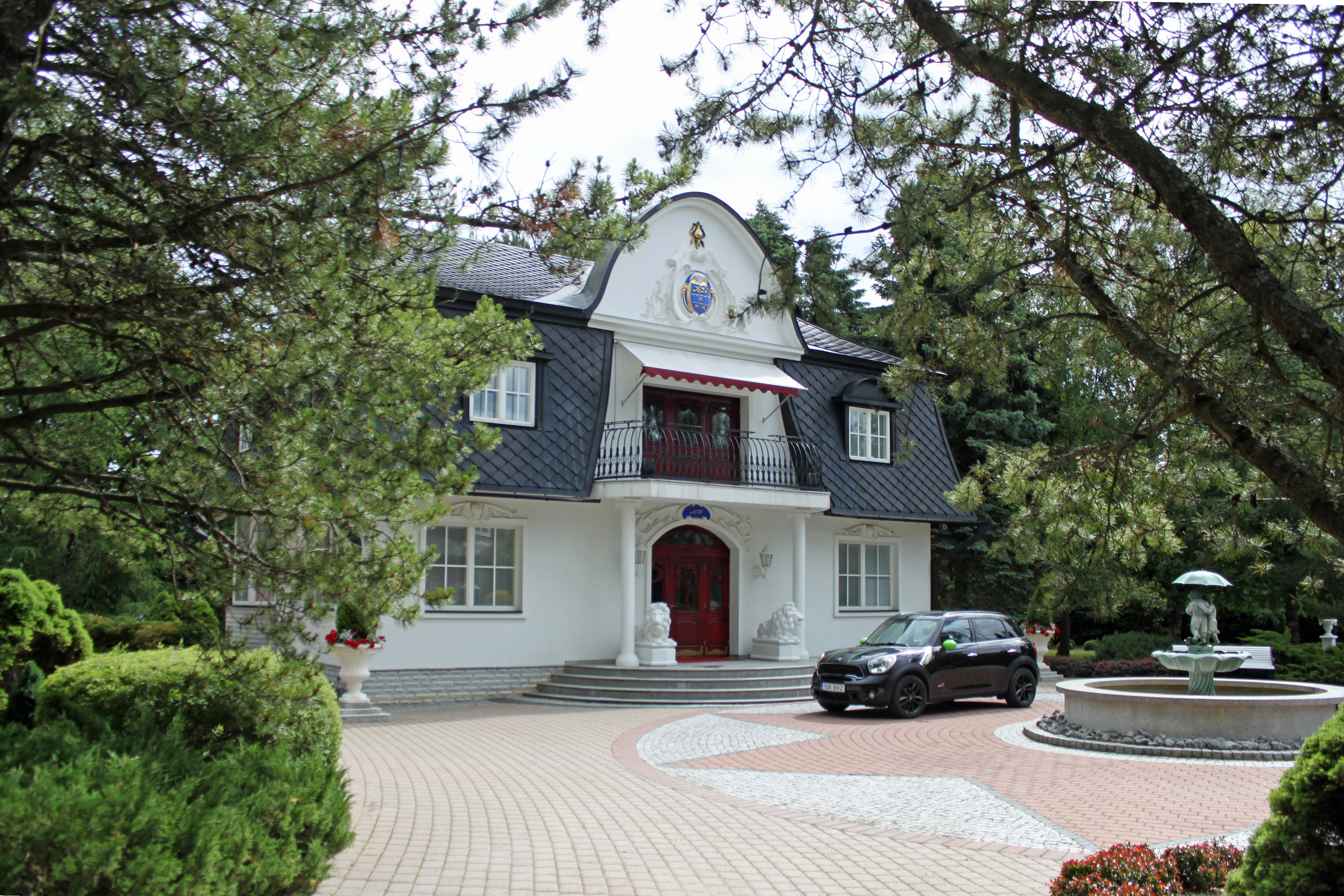
A villa in Tammneeme.
