= Omedu =

Village in Estonia

Coordinates: 58°46′N 27°02′E

- Village
- Interactive map of Omedu
- Country: Estonia
- County: Jõgeva County
- Parish: Mustvee Parish
- Time zone: UTC+2 (EET)
  - Summer (DST): UTC+3 (EEST)

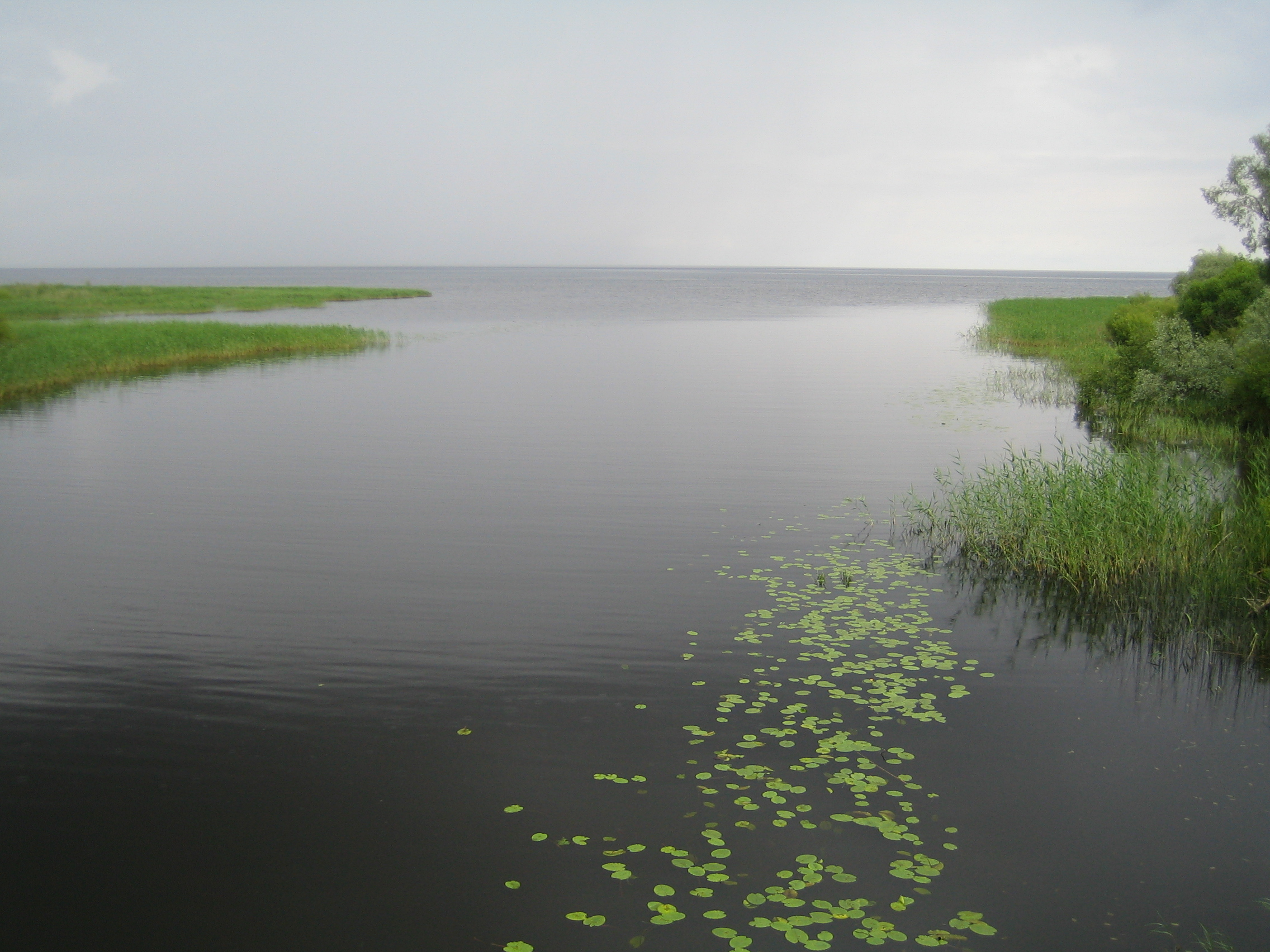
The Omedu River

Omedu is a village in Mustvee Parish, Jõgeva County in eastern Estonia.
