= Kakumäe =

Subdistrict of Tallinn, Estonia

Coordinates: 59.448751°N 24.590798°E

- Subdistrict of Tallinn
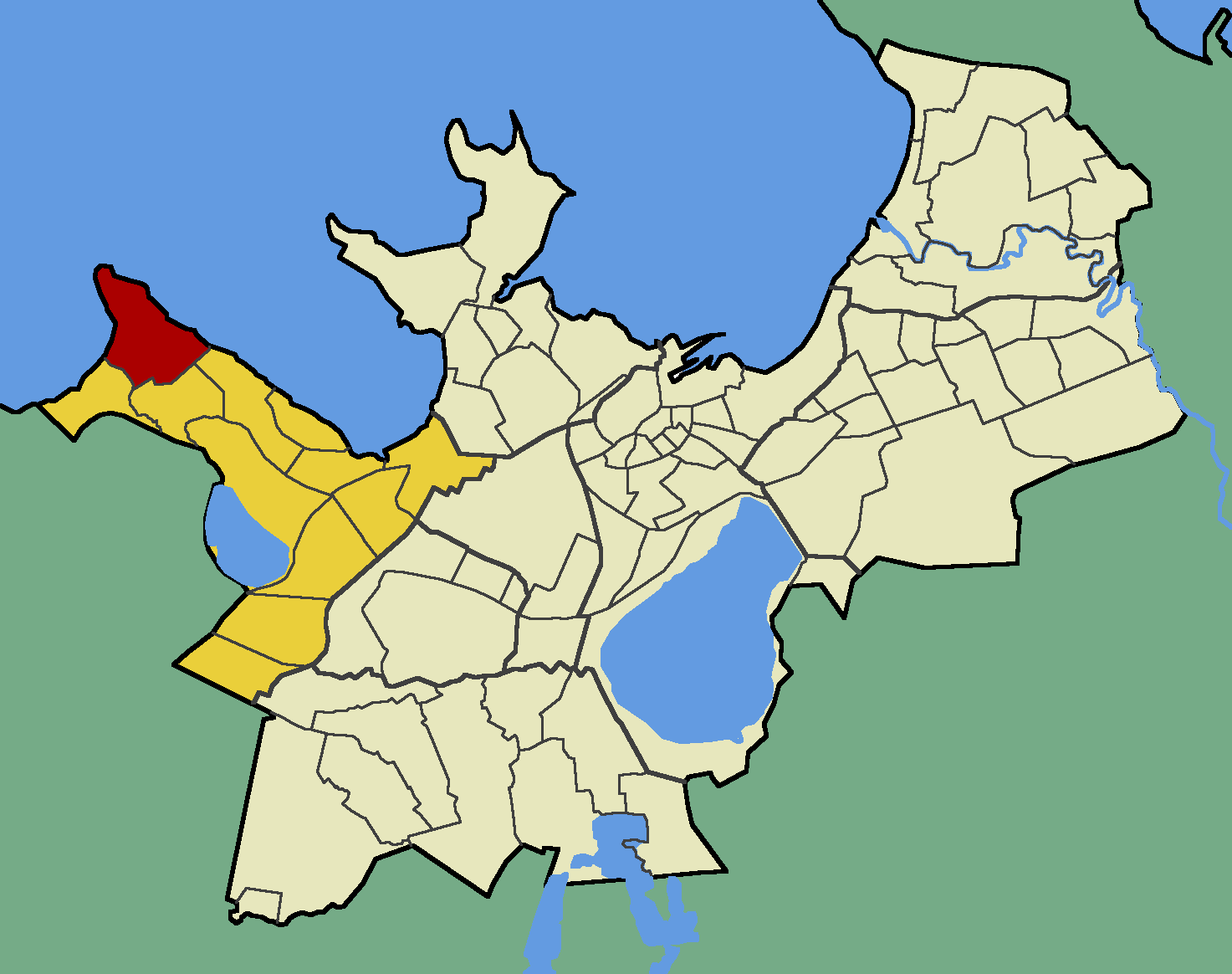
- Kakumäe within Haabersti District.
- Country: Estonia
- County: Harju County
- City: Tallinn
- District: Haabersti

Population (01.01.2015)
  - Total: 1,733

Kakumäe (Estonian for "Owl Hill") is a subdistrict (Estonian: asum) in the district of Haabersti, Tallinn, the capital of Estonia. It is located at the top of the Kakumäe Peninsula, which is part of the Baltic Klint in the Tallinn Bay. Kakumäe has a population of 1,733 (as of 1 January 2015) and is one of the wealthiest regions in Estonia.

The small island of Liivakari belongs to Kakumäe, located near Cape Kakumäe.

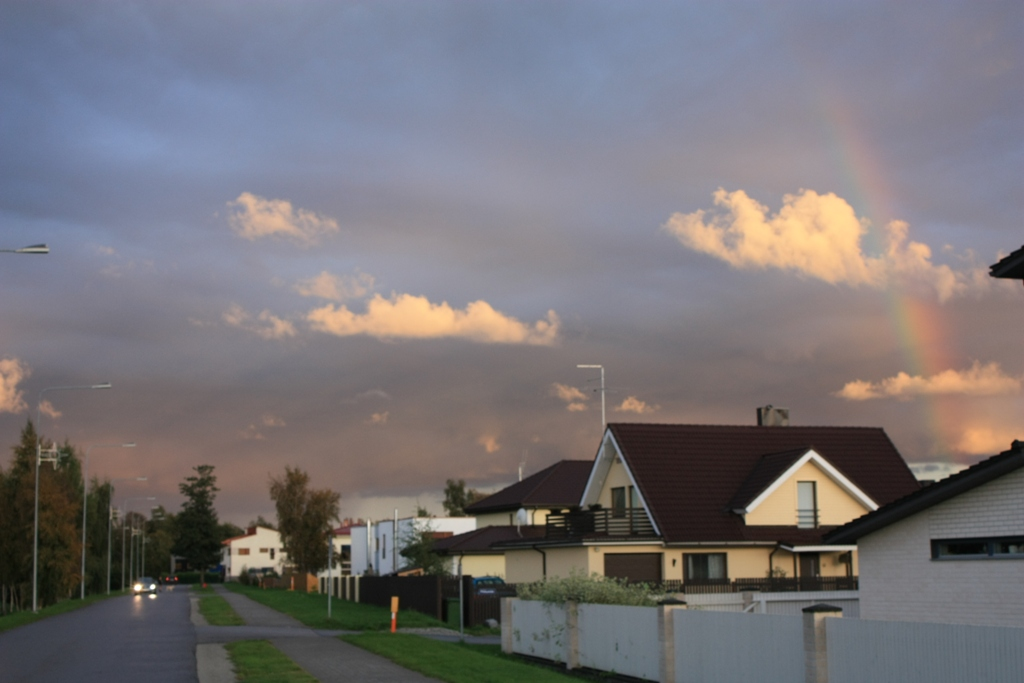

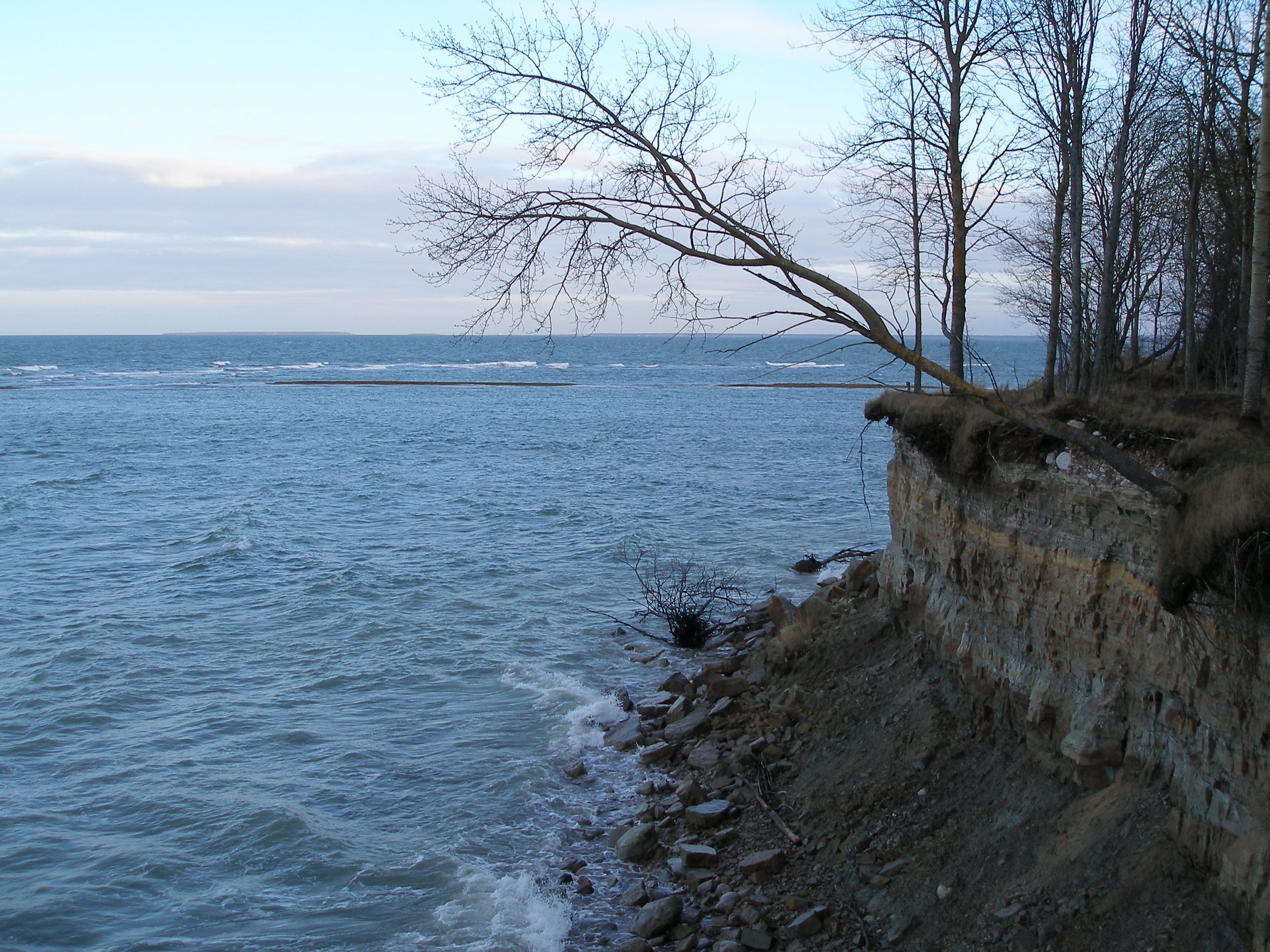
Kakumäe cliff at the end of Kakumäe peninsula

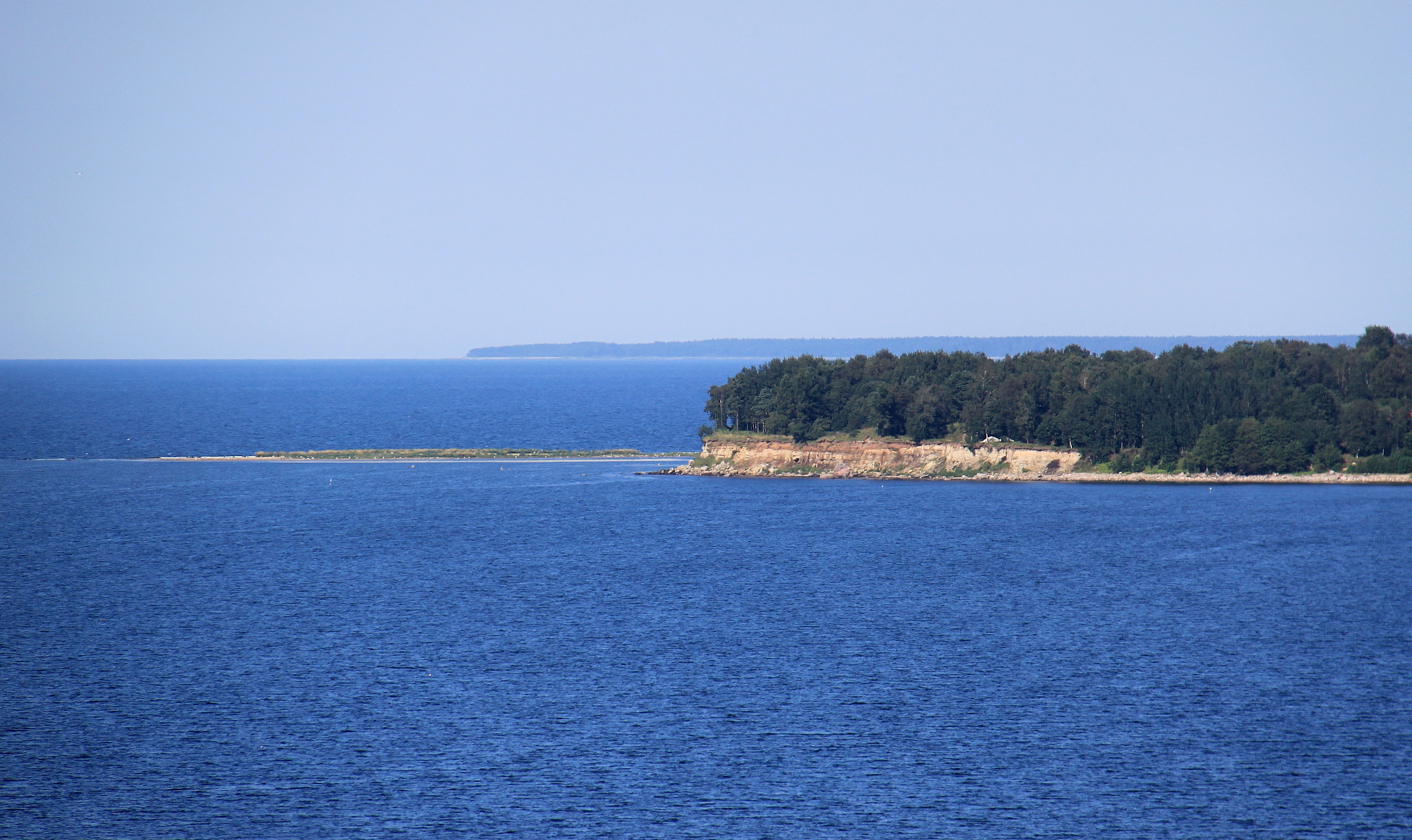
Kakumäe peninsula seen from Tabasalu cliff

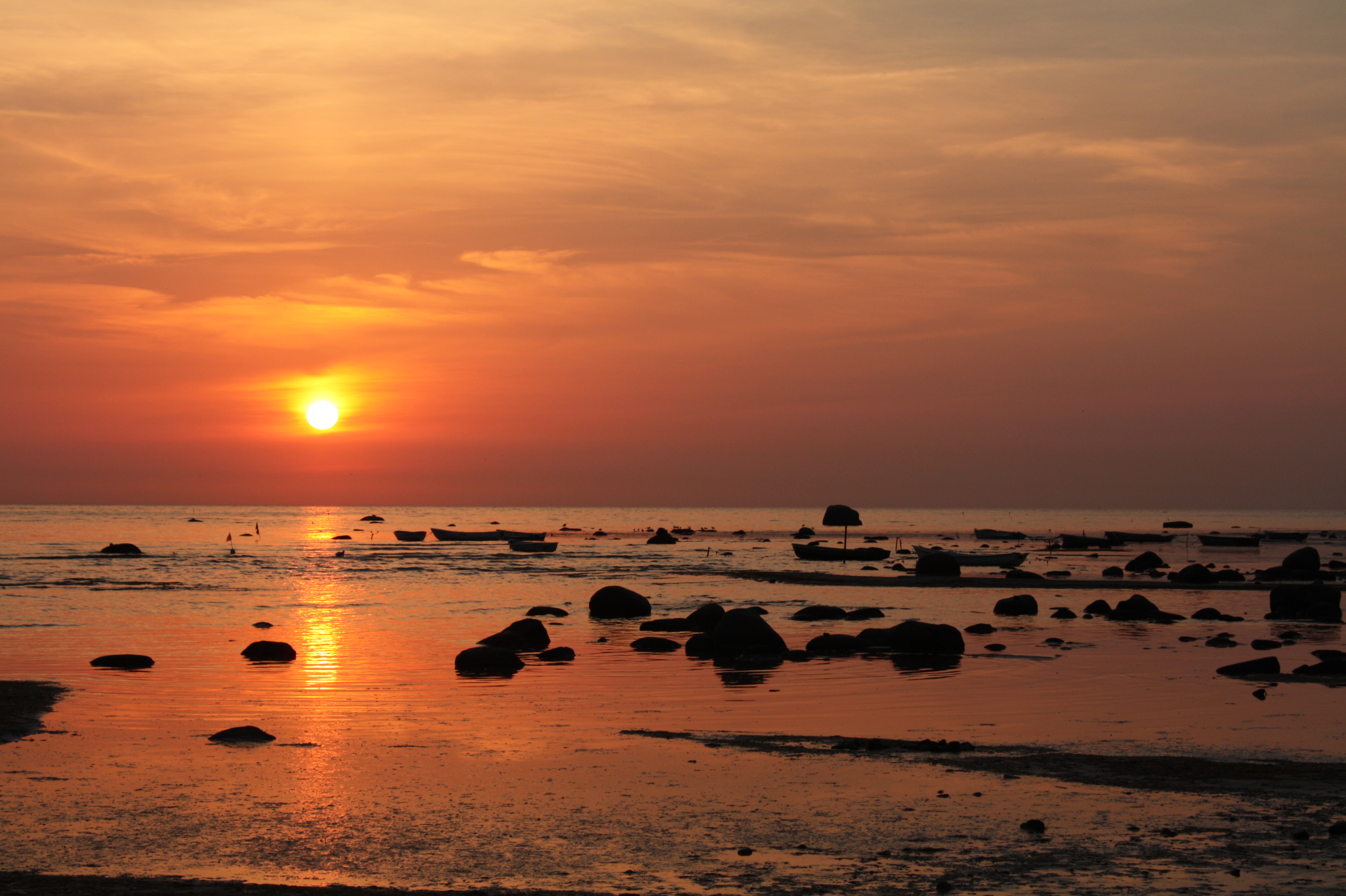
Sunset at Kakumäe

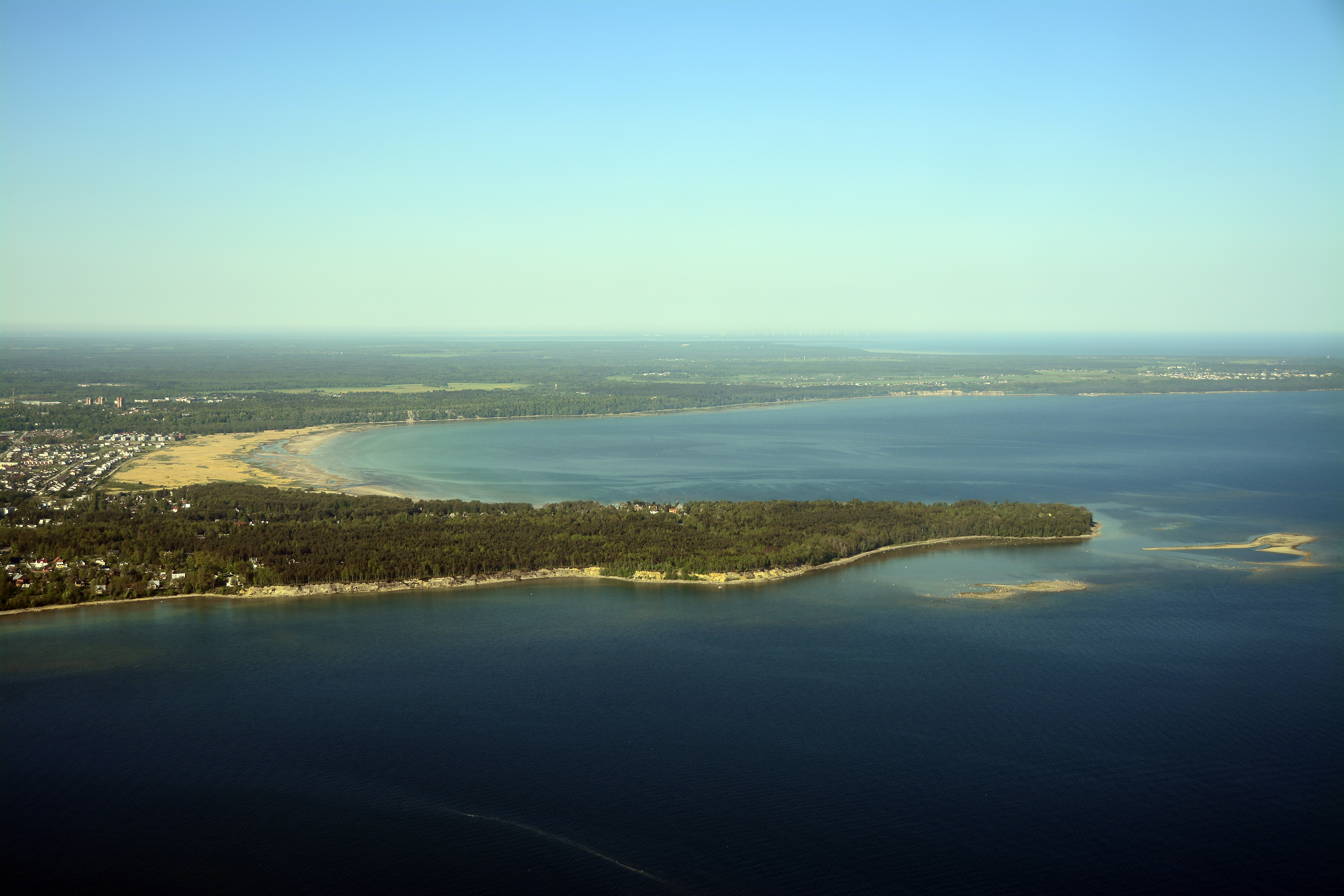
View of Cape Kakumäe

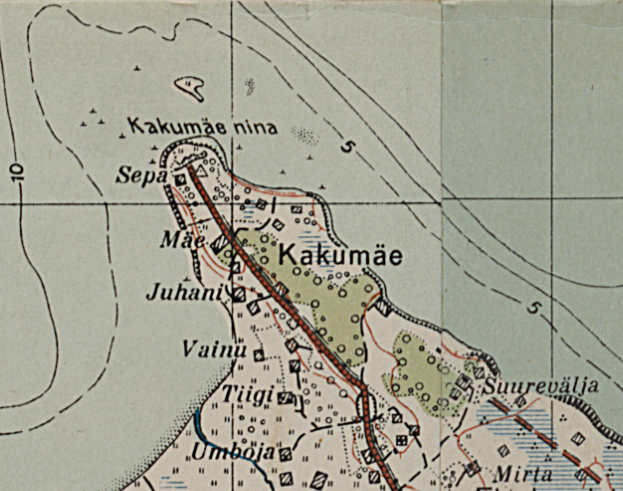
Map of Kakumäe from 1936

== Restaurants ==
Puri is a restaurant located at Haven Kakumäe Marina in Kakumäe. It is included in the Michelin Guide's restaurant selection and is classified as Modern Cuisine.
