= Miiduranna =

Village in Estonia

- Village
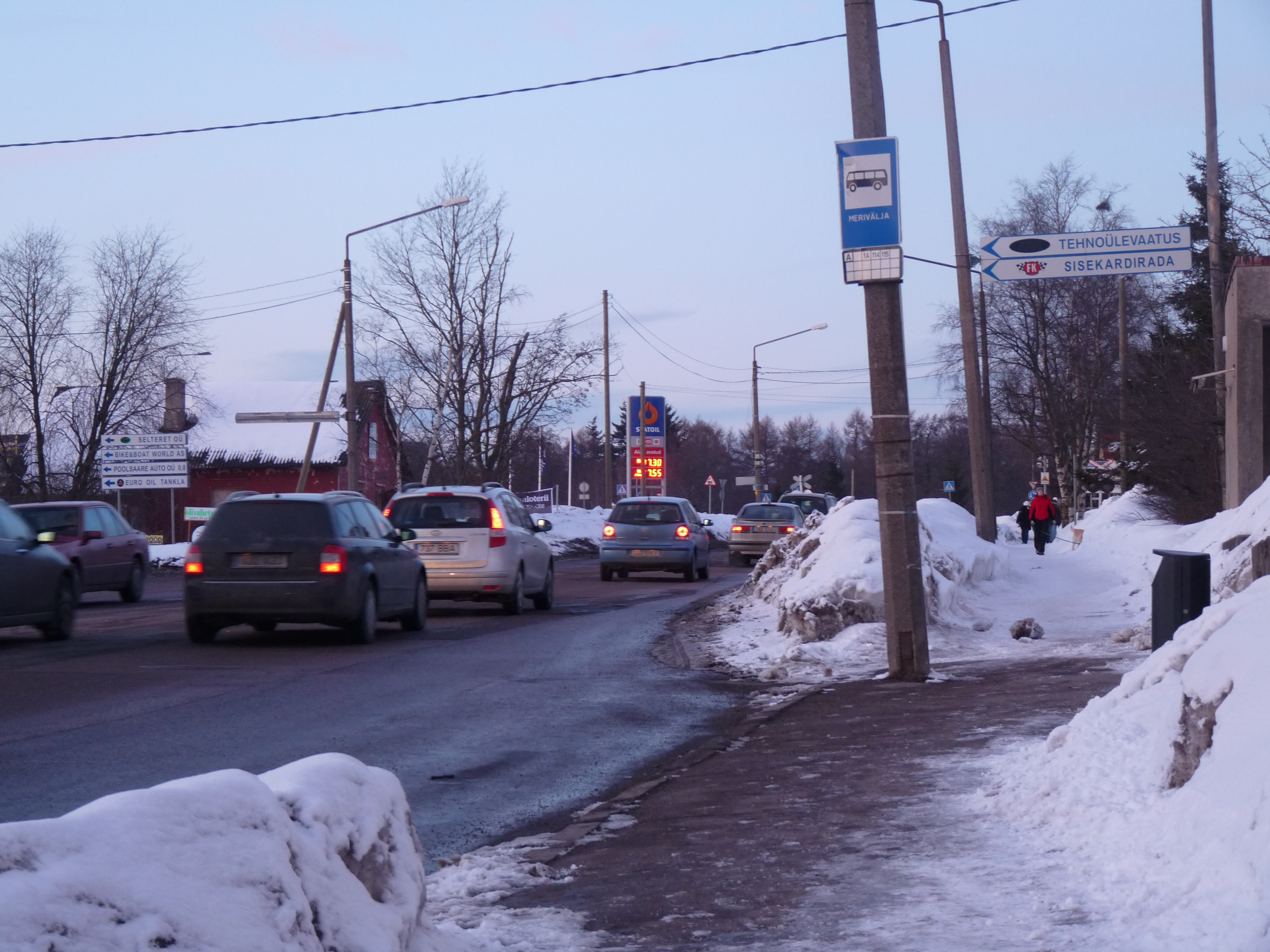
- The main entrance to Viimsi Parish from Tallinn on a railway crossing in Miiduranna

- Location in Estonia
- Coordinates: 59°30′06″N 24°48′52″E
- Country: Estonia
- County: Harju County
- Municipality: Viimsi Parish
- First mentioned: 1588

Population (2011 Census)
  - Total: 358

Miiduranna is a village in Viimsi Parish, Harju County in northern Estonia. It is located about 8 km (5 mi) northeast of the centre of Tallinn, situated just northwest of Tallinn's subdistrict Merivälja, west of the settlement of Viimsi and south of Haabneeme, on the eastern coast of Tallinn Bay. As of the 2011 census, the settlement's population was 358. It is one of the wealthiest regions in Estonia.

Half of the village's area is occupied by Miiduranna Harbour, which is connected to Maardu via railroad. The Reidikai submarine refueling structure is located in the harbour.

Miiduranna was first mentioned in 1588 as Mitorannes.

Miiduranna is connected to the centre of Tallinn by Tallinn Bus Company's route no. 1A (Viru keskus – Viimsi Keskus); average travel time is about 25 minutes.

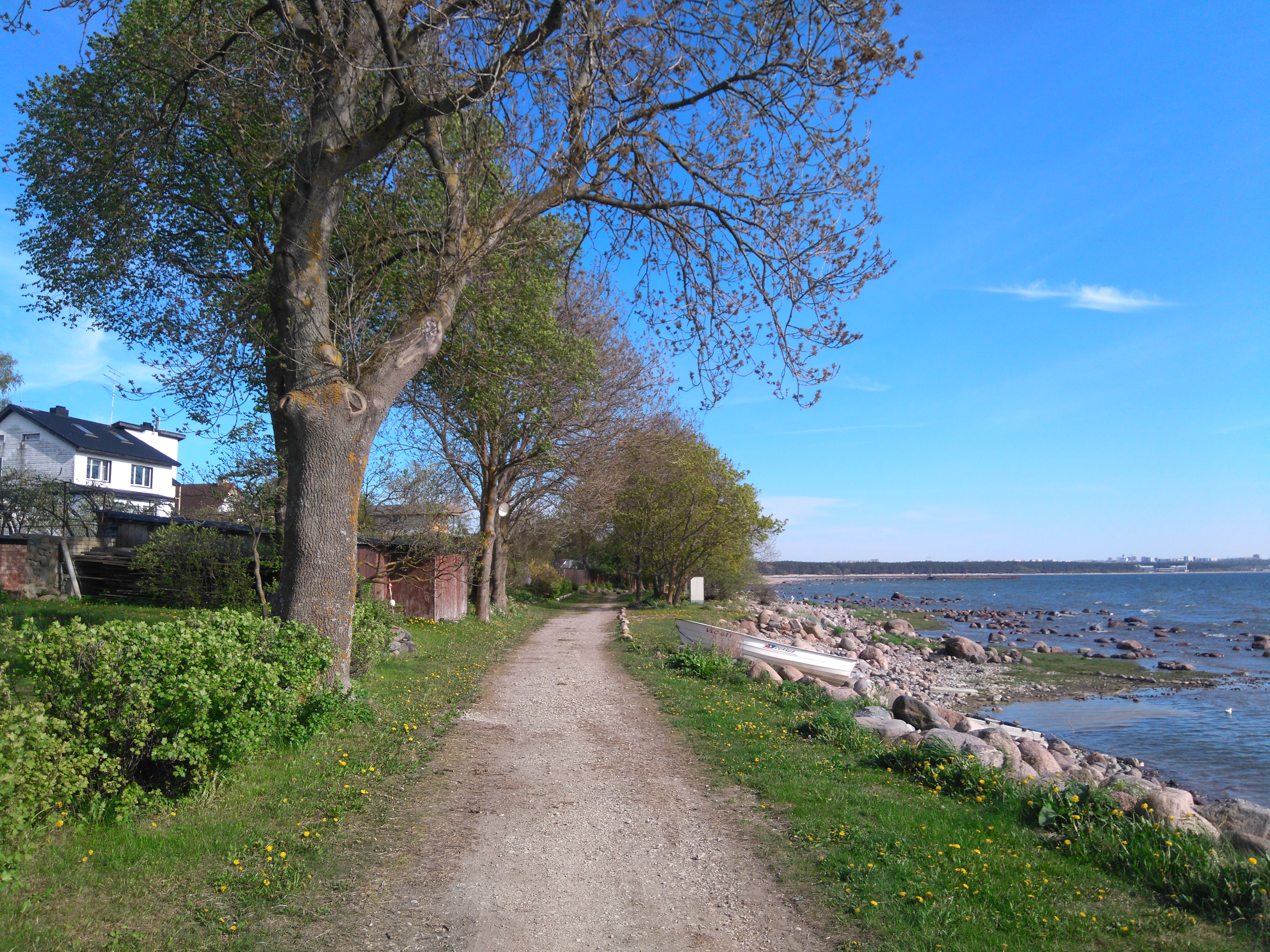
Seashore at Miiduranna
