= Neeme, Harju County =

Village in Estonia

Coordinates: 59°32′02″N 25°09′08″E

Neeme
- Village
- Interactive map of Neeme
- Country: Estonia
- County: Harju County
- Parish: Jõelähtme Parish
- Time zone: UTC+2 (EET)
  - Summer (DST): UTC+3 (EEST)

Neeme is a village in Jõelähtme Parish, Harju County in northern Estonia.
