= Haabneeme =

Borough in Estonia

- Small borough
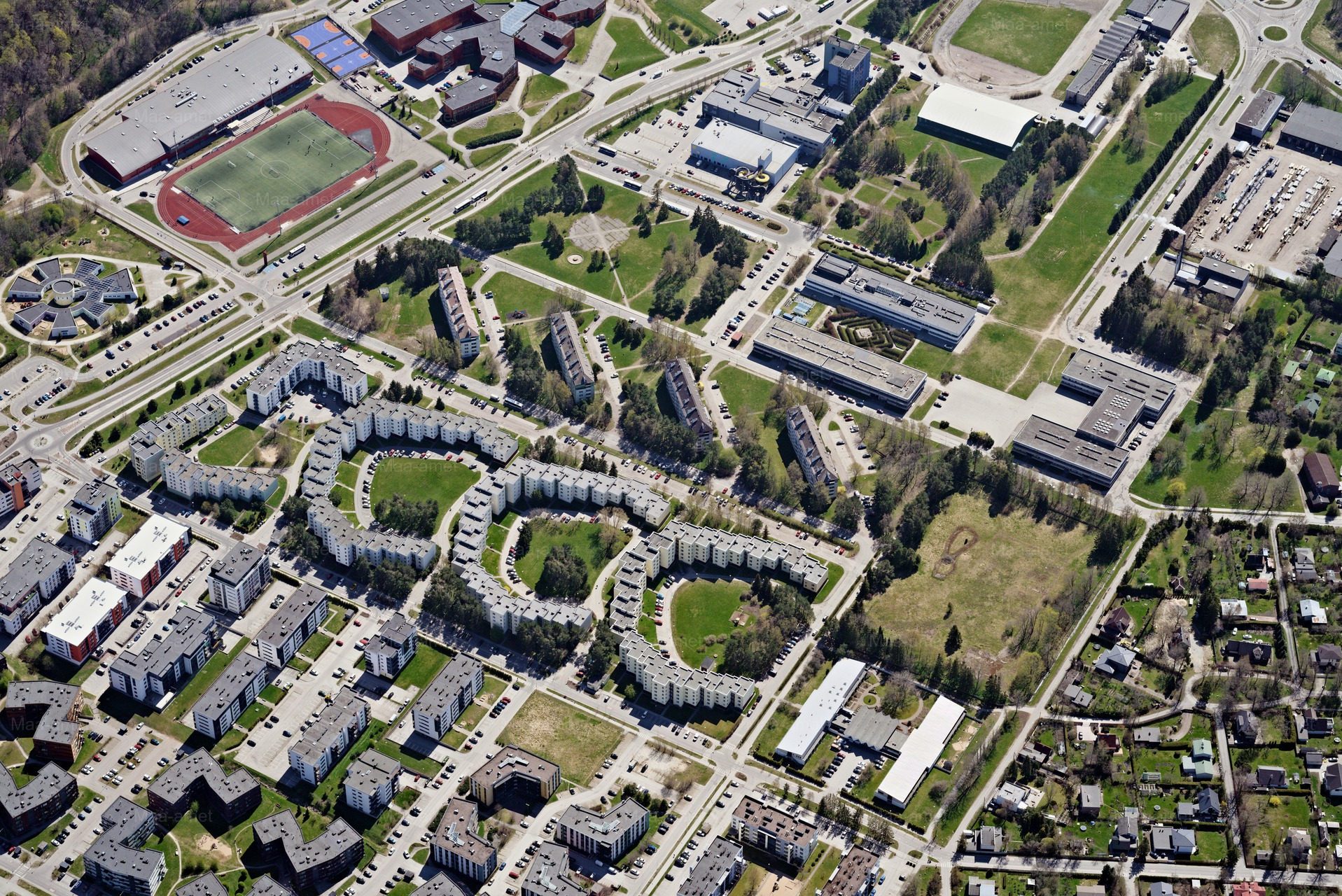
- Haabneeme from above

- Location in Estonia
- Coordinates: 59°30′37″N 24°49′35″E
- Country: Estonia
- County: Harju County
- Municipality: Viimsi Parish
- First mentioned: 1271

Population (As of 01.01.2025)
  - Total: 7,139

Haabneeme is a small borough (Estonian: alevik) in Viimsi Parish, Harju County, in northern Estonia alongside Viimsi. It's located about 9 km (6 mi) northeast of the centre of Tallinn, on the eastern coast of Tallinn Bay. With a population of 7,139 (As of 1 January 2025), Haabneeme is the largest settlement in the municipality.

Haabneeme was first mentioned in 1271 as Apones. During the Middle Ages Haabneeme was settled by Coastal Swedes. In the 1960s, Haabneeme garden city developed on both sides of the Rohuneeme road in the north. The central settlement was built from the 1960s to 1980s as the centre of the Kirov Collective Fishing Farm. In 1973 a new administrative building was opened. The shopping centre was built in 1976, hospital-polyclinic in 1979. As an addition to apartment buildings, a pension was opened in 1974, stadium in 1975, kindergarten in 1983 and a high school in 1981–1985.

In the 21st century, many new buildings such as a spa hotel, water park, new school buildings and kindergartens and several supermarkets have been opened.

Haabneeme is connected to the centre of Tallinn by Tallinn Bus Company's route no. 1 (Viru keskus – Viimsi Keskus), average traveling time is about 30 minutes.

A new two-storey shopping centre with Selver hypermarket was opened in Haabneeme in 2015.

Viimsi St. James' Church is located in Haabneeme.

== Gallery ==
Viimsi Gymnasium

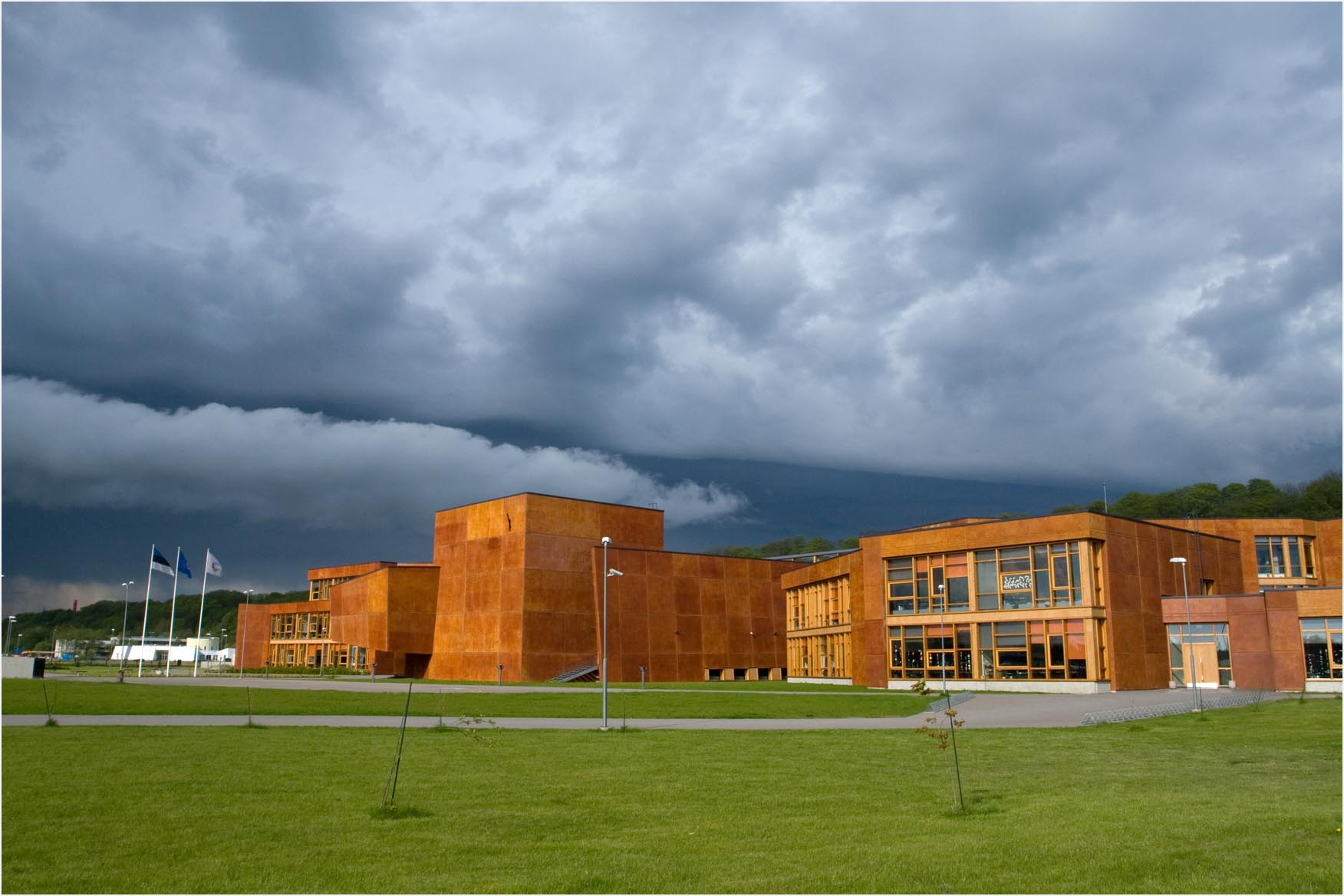
Viimsi school building

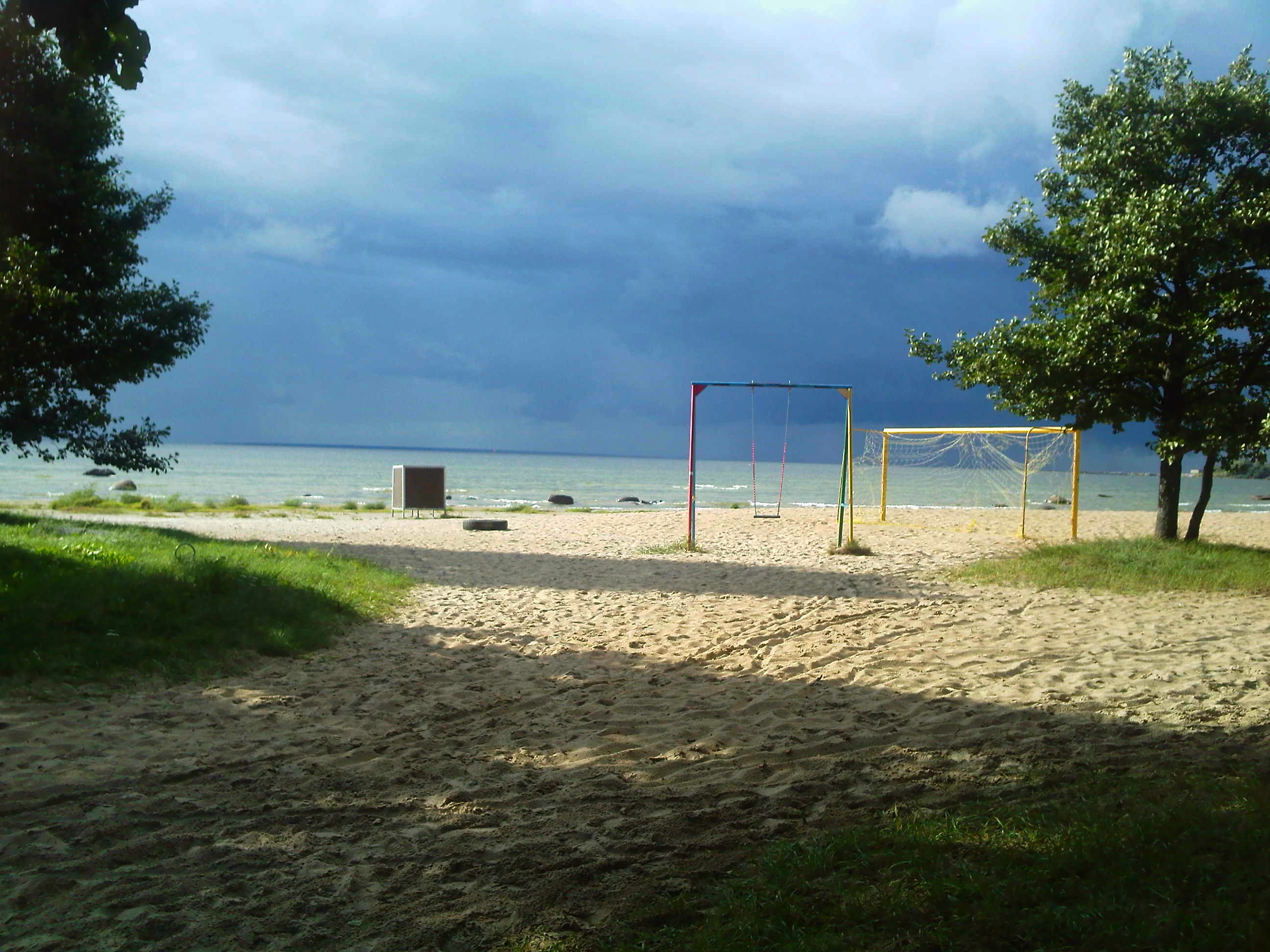
Haabneeme beach

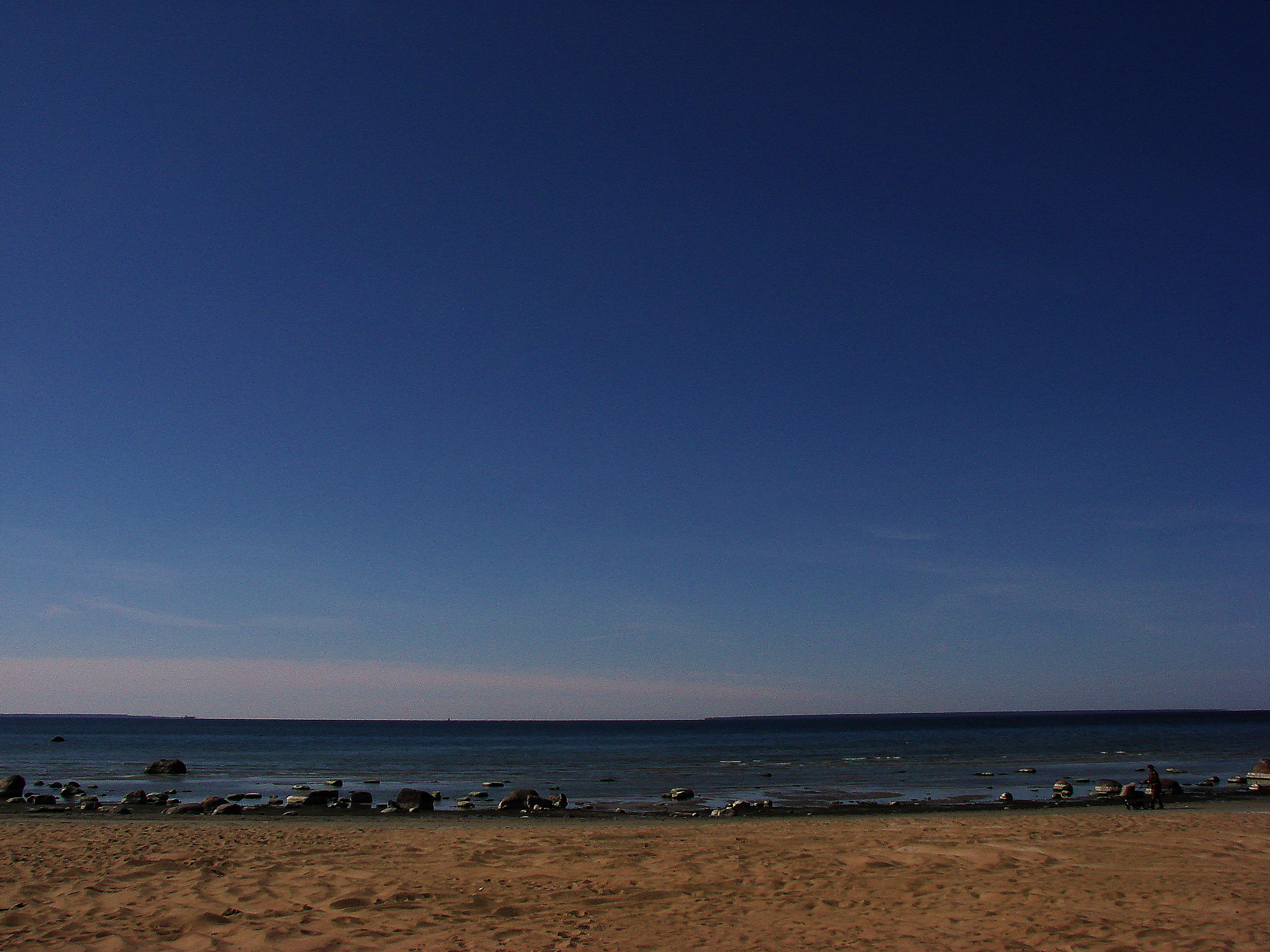
Haabneeme beach

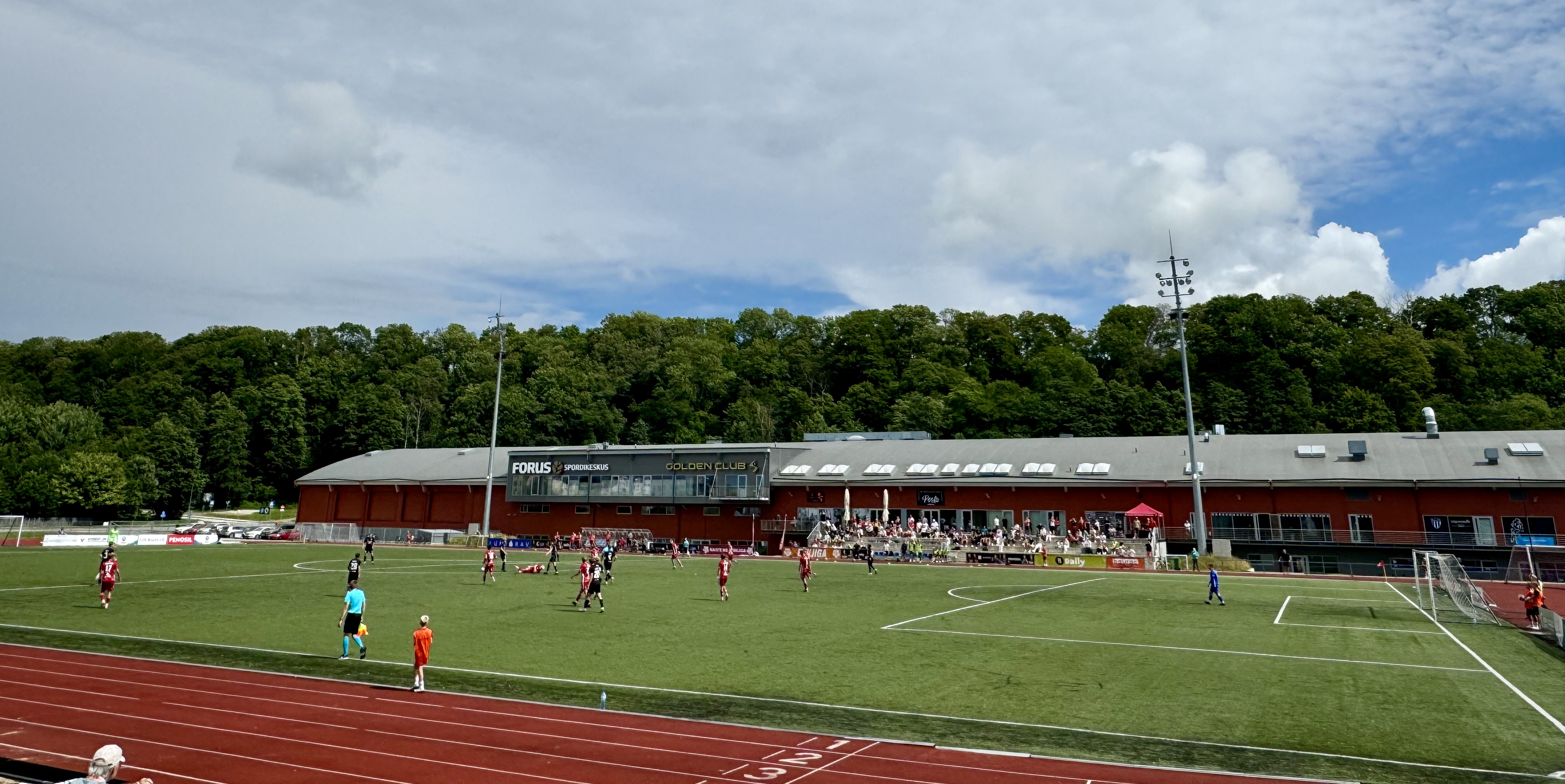
Viimsi Stadium during Viimsi JK match

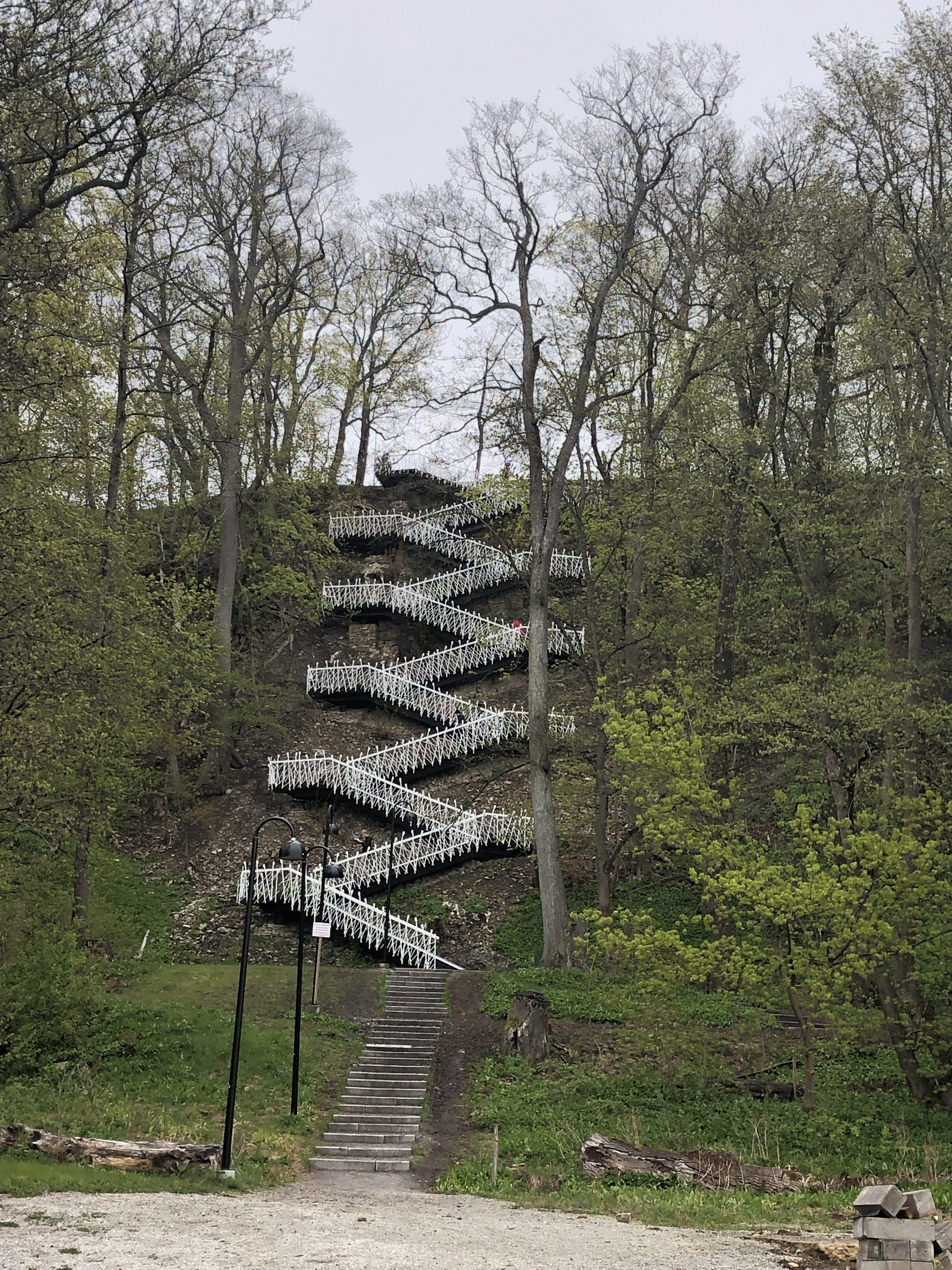
Põhjakonna stairs

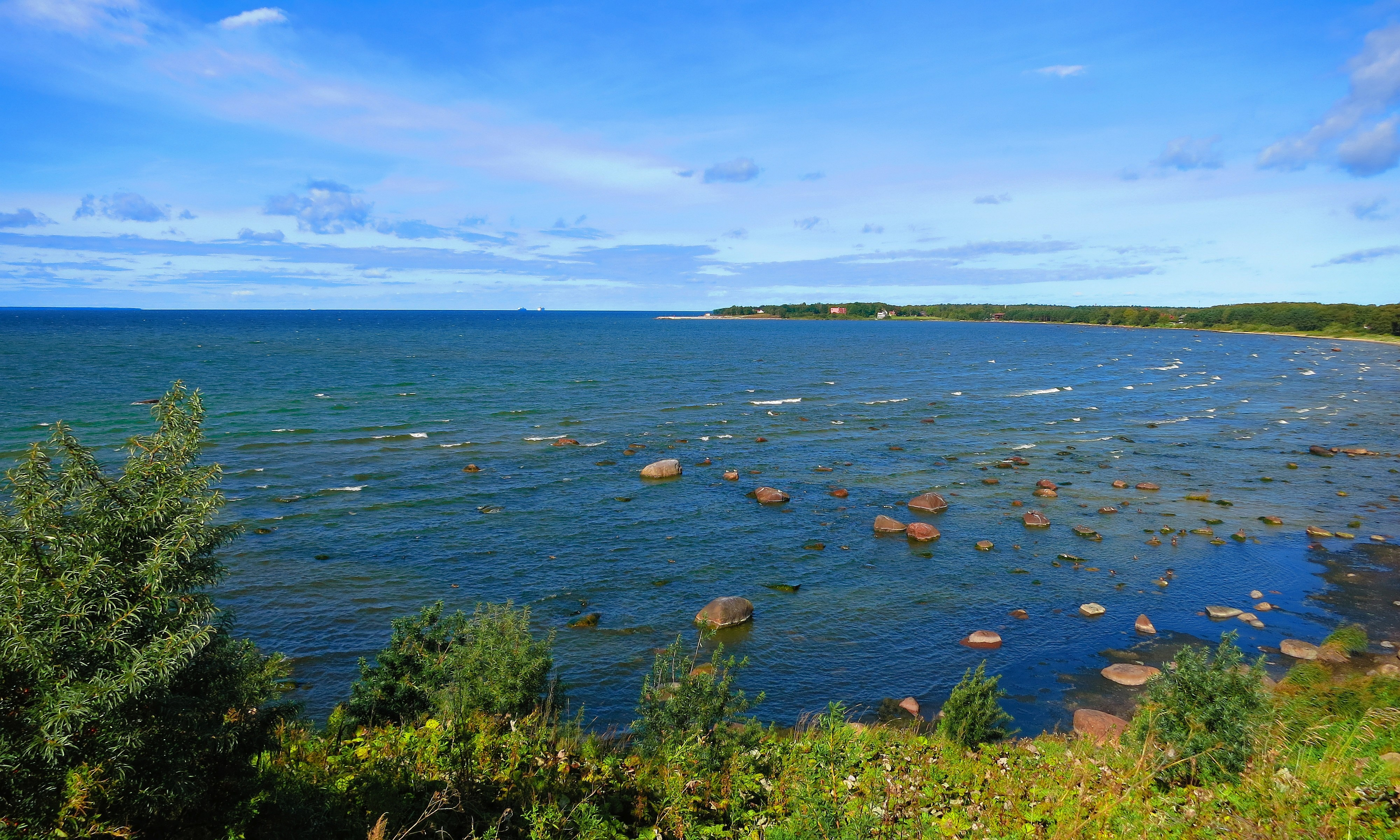
Haabneeme Bay

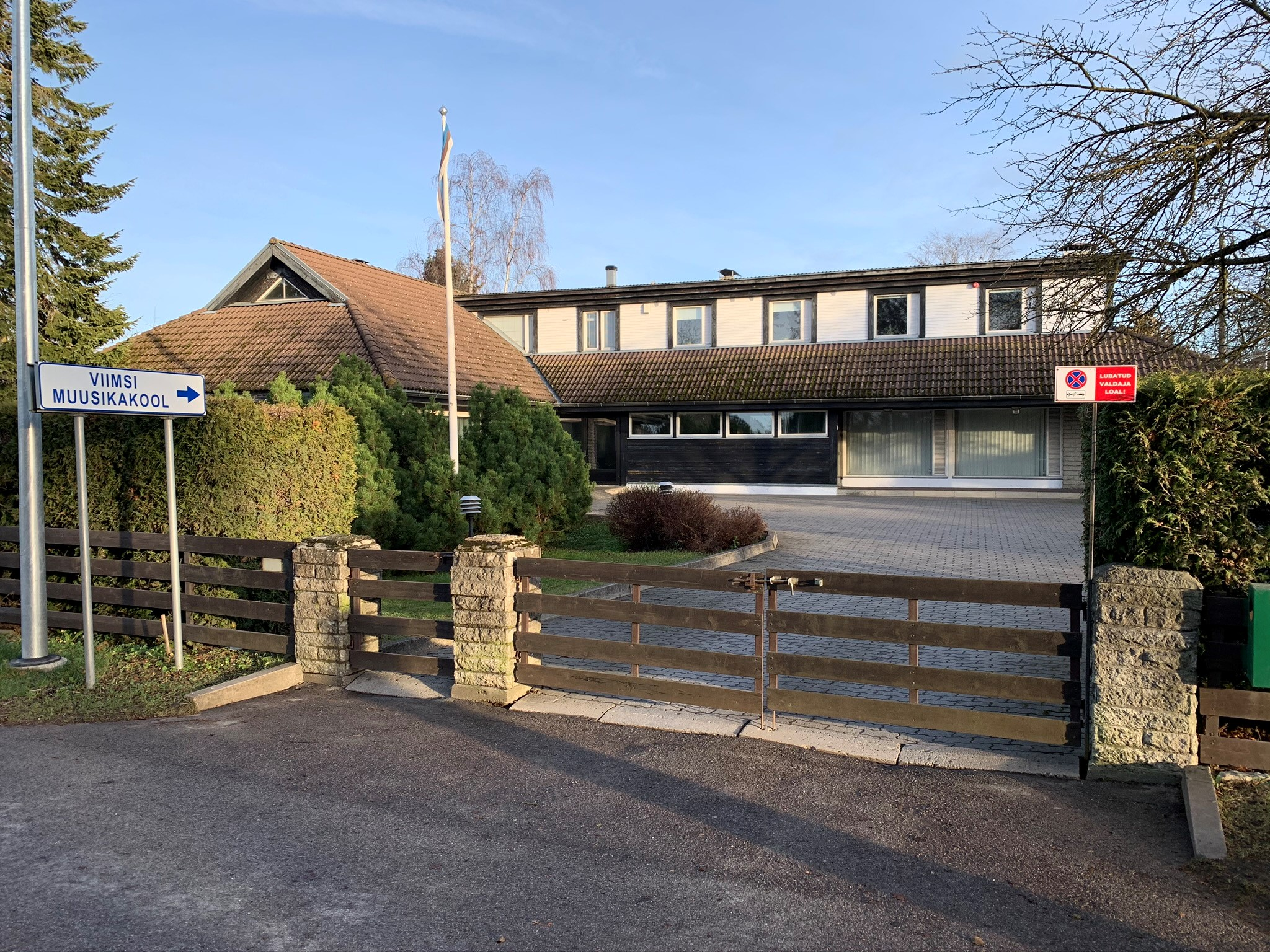
A street view

== See also ==
- Viimsi JK
- KK Viimsi
- Viimsi Stadium
