= Pringi, Harju County =

Village in Estonia

Pringi
- Village
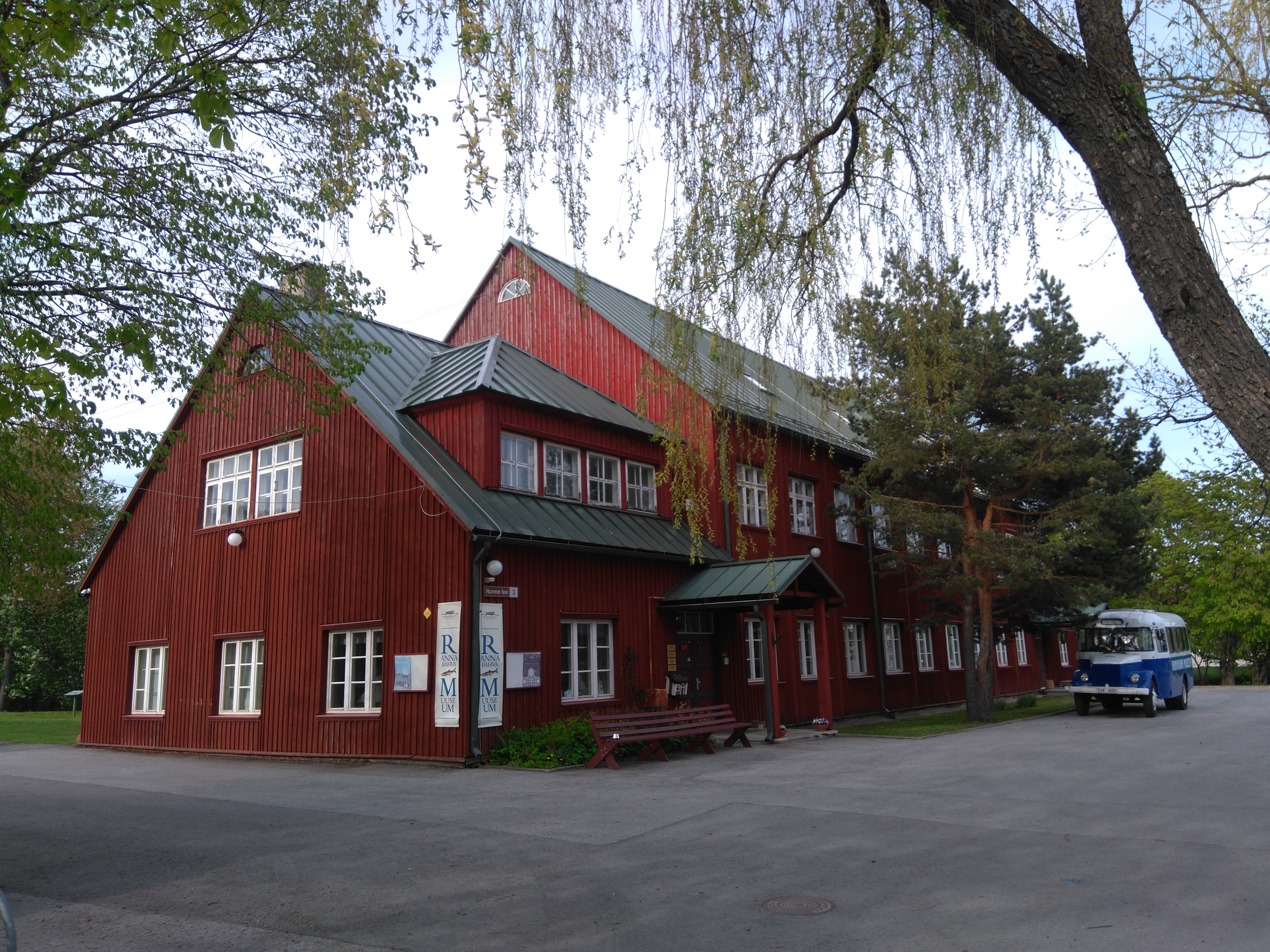
- The Viimsi Coastal Folk Museum in Pringi

- Location in Estonia
- Coordinates: 59°31′34″N 24°47′56″E
- Country: Estonia
- County: Harju County
- Municipality: Viimsi Parish

Population (01.01.2011)
  - Total: 951

Pringi is a village in Viimsi Parish, Harju County in northern Estonia. It is located about 10 km (6 mi) northeast of the centre of Tallinn, located just northwest of the settlement of Haabneeme on the coast of Tallinn Bay. Pringi has a population of 951 (as of 1 January 2011).

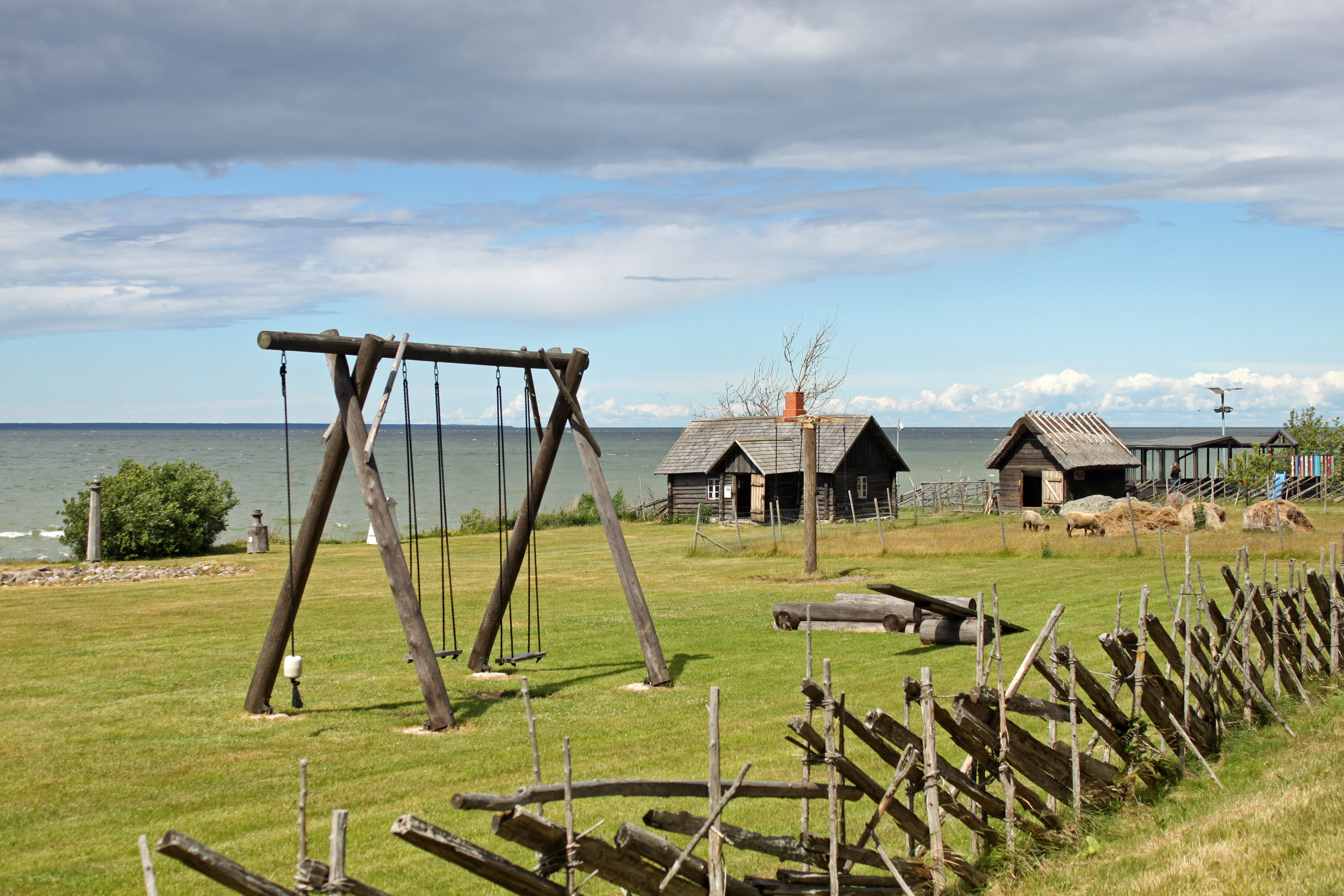
The Viimsi Coastal Folk Museum

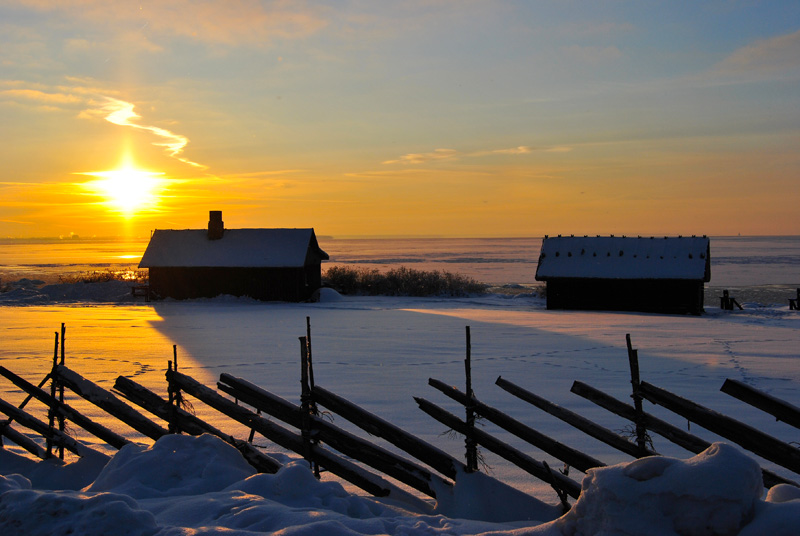
The Open Air Museum

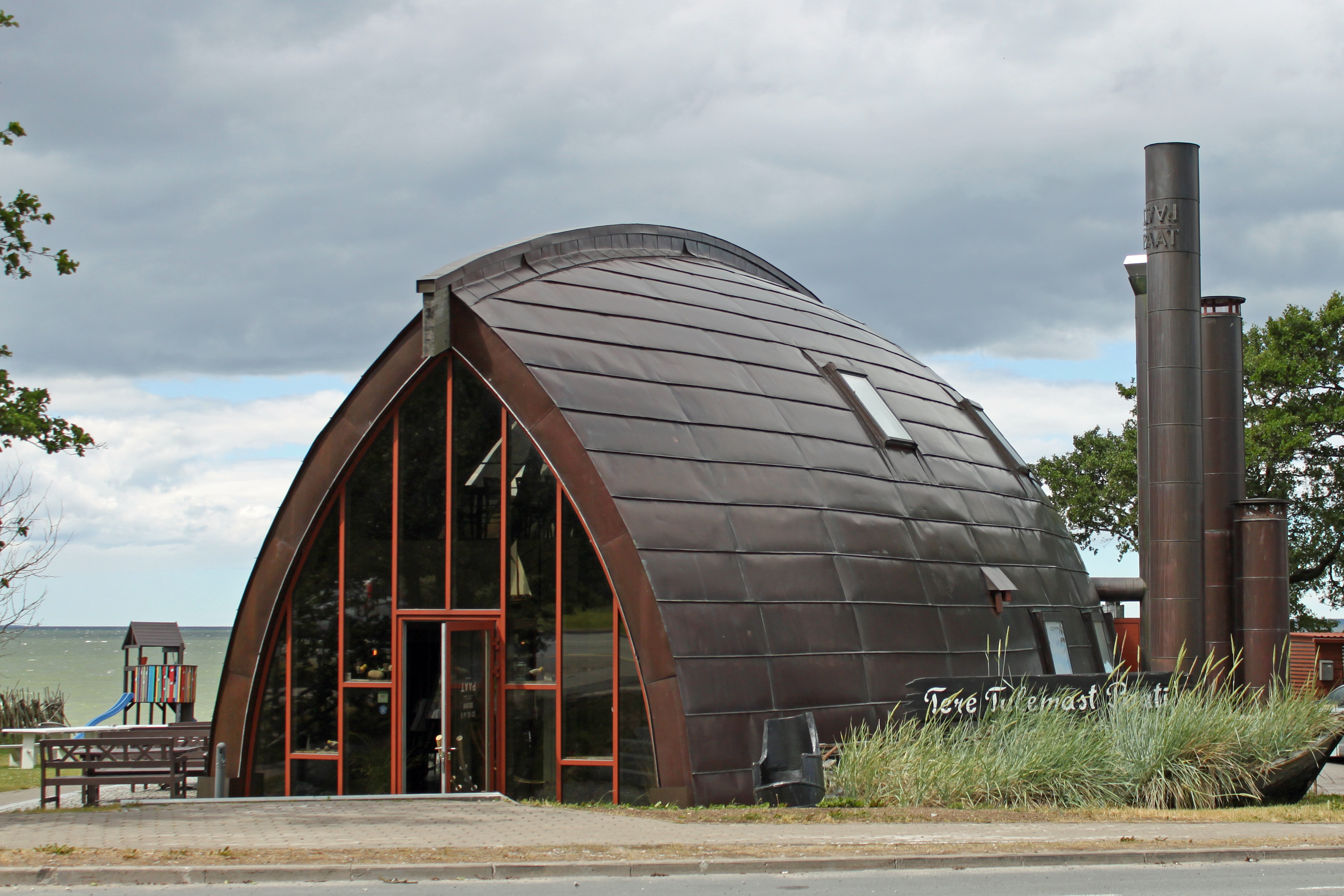
The Boat Restaurant
