= Muuga =

Muuga may refer to several places in Estonia:

- Muuga, Lääne-Viru County, a village in Vinni Parish, Lääne-Viru County
  - Muuga Manor
- Muuga, Viimsi Parish, a village in Viimsi Parish, Harju County
  - Muuga Harbour
  - Muuga Bay
- Muuga aedlinn (Muuga garden city), district of Maardu, Harju County
