= Randvere, Harju County =

Village in Estonia

Randvere
- village
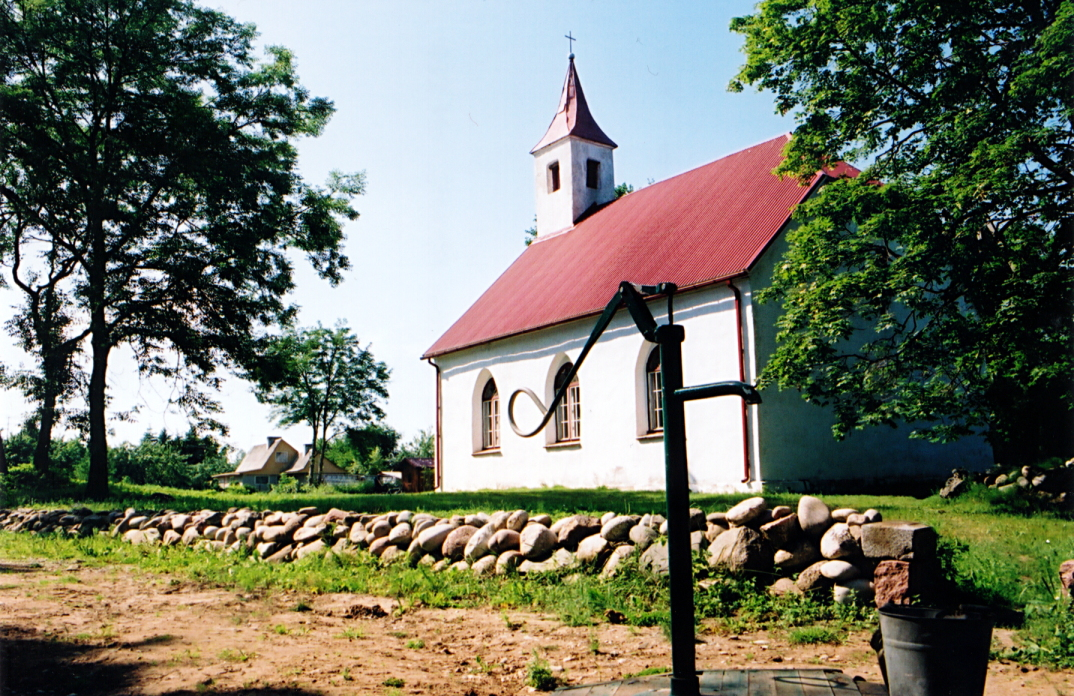
- Randvere church

- Location in Estonia
- Coordinates: 59°30′32″N 24°53′59″E
- Country: Estonia
- County: Harju County
- Municipality: Viimsi Parish
- First mentioned: 1397

Government
  - Village elder: Priit Robas

Population (2011 Census)
  - Total: 1,690

Randvere is a village in Viimsi Parish, Harju County in northern Estonia. It is located about 11 km (7 mi) northeast of the centre of Tallinn, on the coast of Muuga Bay, northwest of the Port of Muuga. As of the 2011 census, the settlement's population was 1,690.

Randvere was first mentioned in 1397. During the Middle Ages, Randvere was settled by Coastal Swedes and belonged under the Maardu Manor (located in the village of Maardu). Randvere Lutheran Church was built between 1848 and 1852.

The Estonian minstrel Mari Kilu (1853–1947; :et) was born and lived in Randvere.

Randvere is connected to the centre of Tallinn by Tallinn Bus Company's route no. 38 (Viru keskus – Muuga); the average travel time is about 30 minutes.
