= Muuga, Viimsi Parish =

Village in Estonia

Muuga
- village
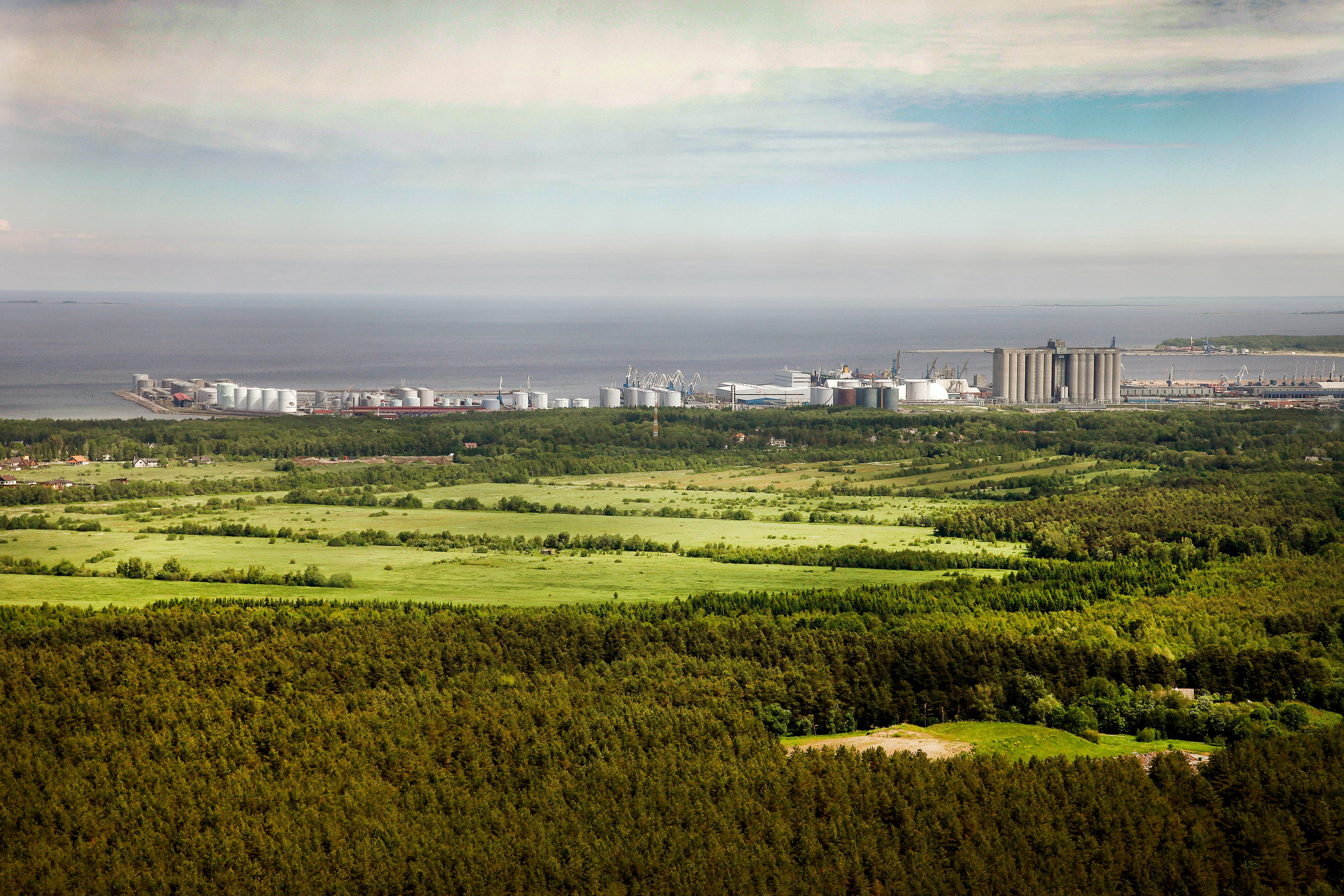
- Port of Muuga in the background.

- Location in Estonia
- Coordinates: 59°29′17″N 24°55′48″E
- Country: Estonia
- County: Harju County
- Municipality: Viimsi Parish

Population (2011 Census)
  - Total: 581

Muuga is a village in Viimsi Parish, Harju County in northern Estonia. It is located about 12 km (7 mi) northeast of the centre of Tallinn, just north of Maardu's district of Muuga aedlinn (Muuga garden city), on the coast of Muuga Bay. Half of the village's territory is occupied by the Port of Muuga (which also occupies lands from Uusküla and Maardu). As of the 2011 census, the settlement's population was 581, of which the Estonians were 327 (56.3%).

The western part of Muuga is connected to the centre of Tallinn by Tallinn Bus Company's route no. 38 (Viru keskus – Muuga), and the average travel time is about 35 minutes. The eastern part is reachable by route no. 34A (Viru keskus - Muuga aedlinn), and the average travel time is also about 35 minutes, but it is much more frequent.

Estonia's second-largest glacial erratic, Kabelikivi (Chapel Rock), is located in Muuga. It is 18.7 m long, 14.9 m wide, and 6.4 m high, and its above-ground volume is 728 m³.

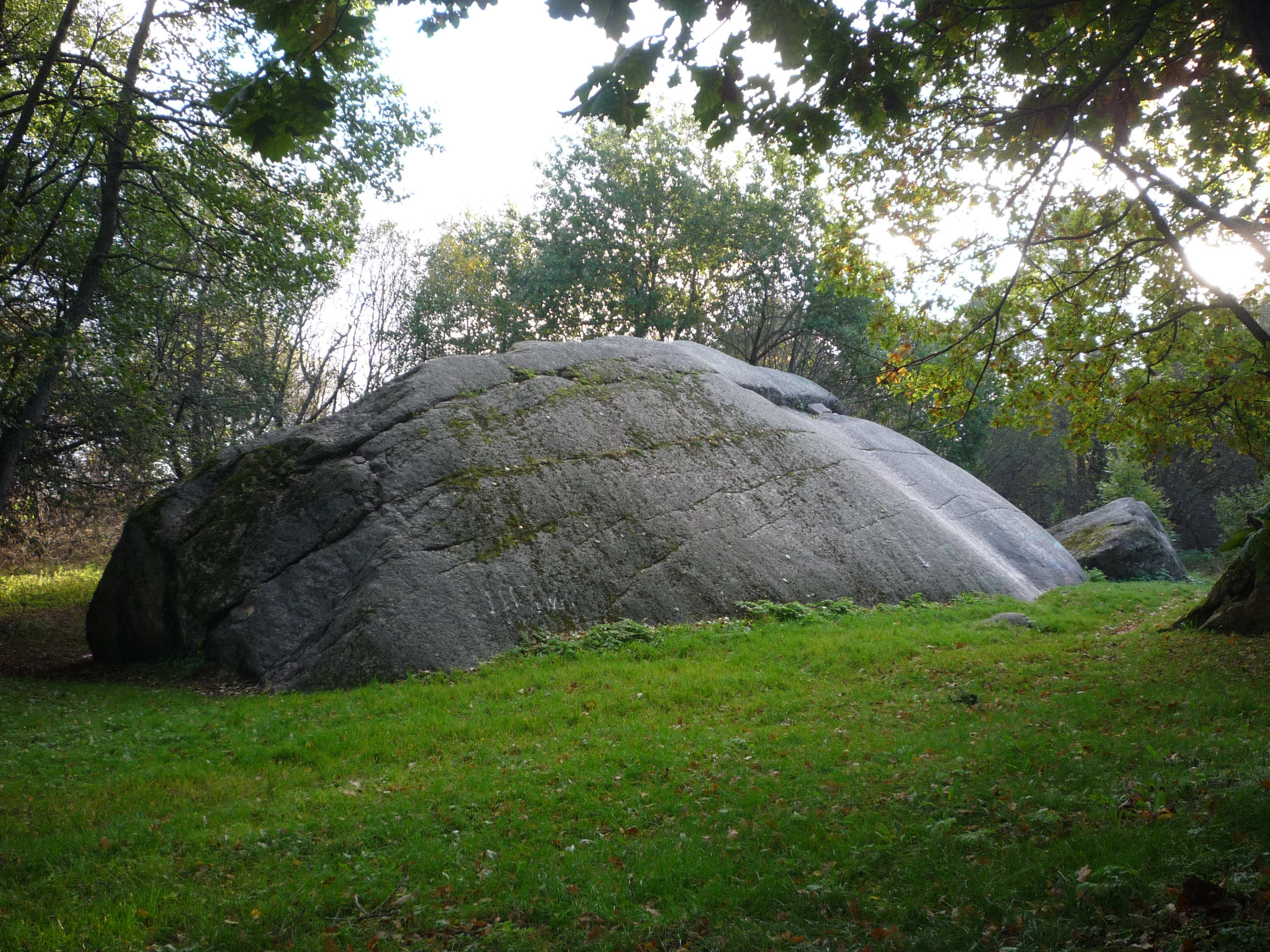
Kabelikivi
