= Saviranna =

Village in Estonia

- Village
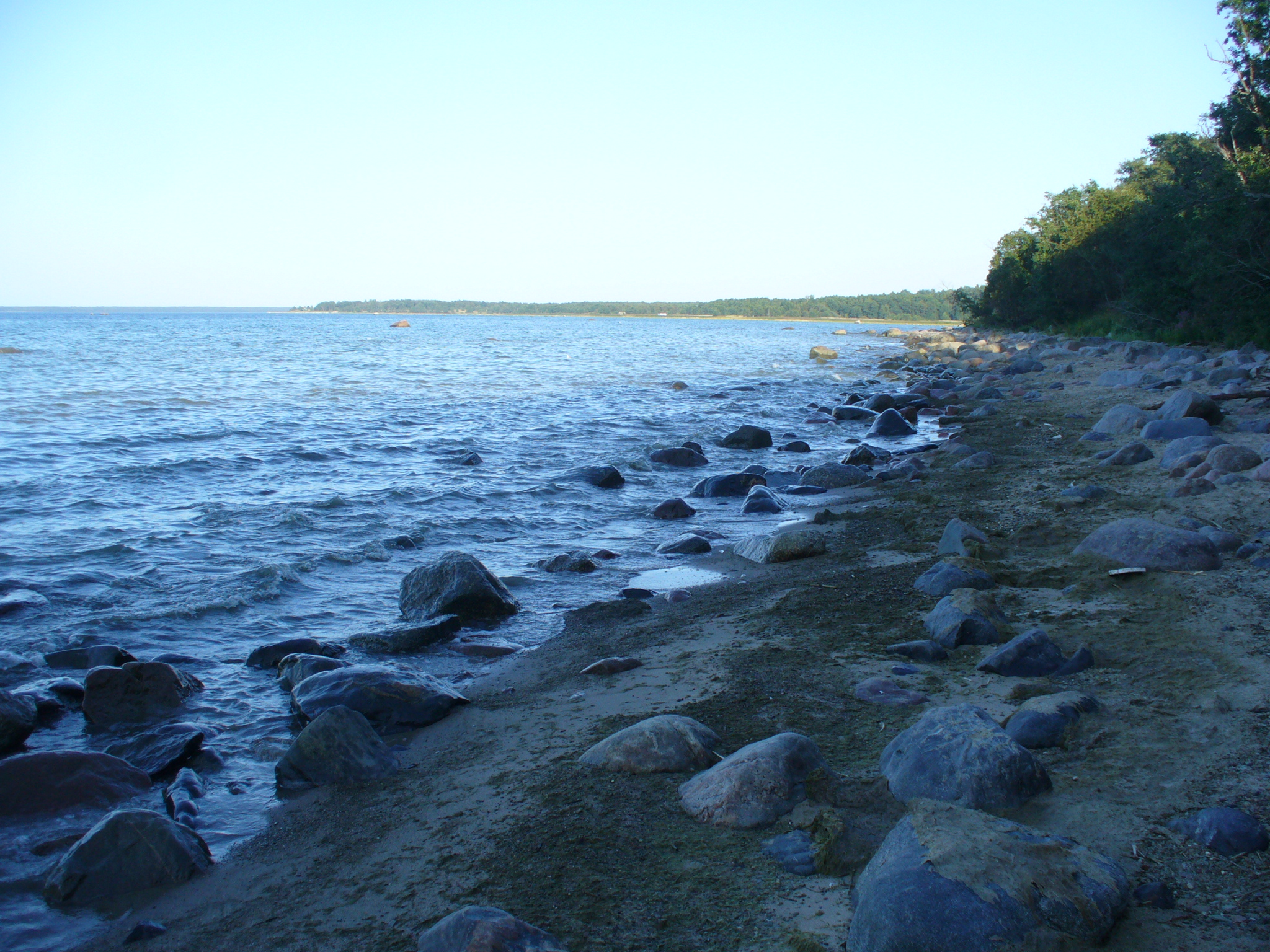
- Saviranna beach

- Location in Estonia
- Coordinates: 59°30′08″N 25°02′24″E
- Country: Estonia
- County: Harju County
- Municipality: Jõelähtme Parish
- Official village: 19 April 2010

Population (01.01.2010)
  - Total: 53

Saviranna (Estonian for "Clay Beach") is a village in Jõelähtme Parish, Harju County, in northern Estonia. It's located about 2 km (1 mi) northeast of the town of Maardu, on the coast of the Gulf of Finland. Saviranna has a population of 53 (as of 1 January 2010)

Saviranna village was reestablished on 19 April 2010 by detaching the land from Kallavere village.

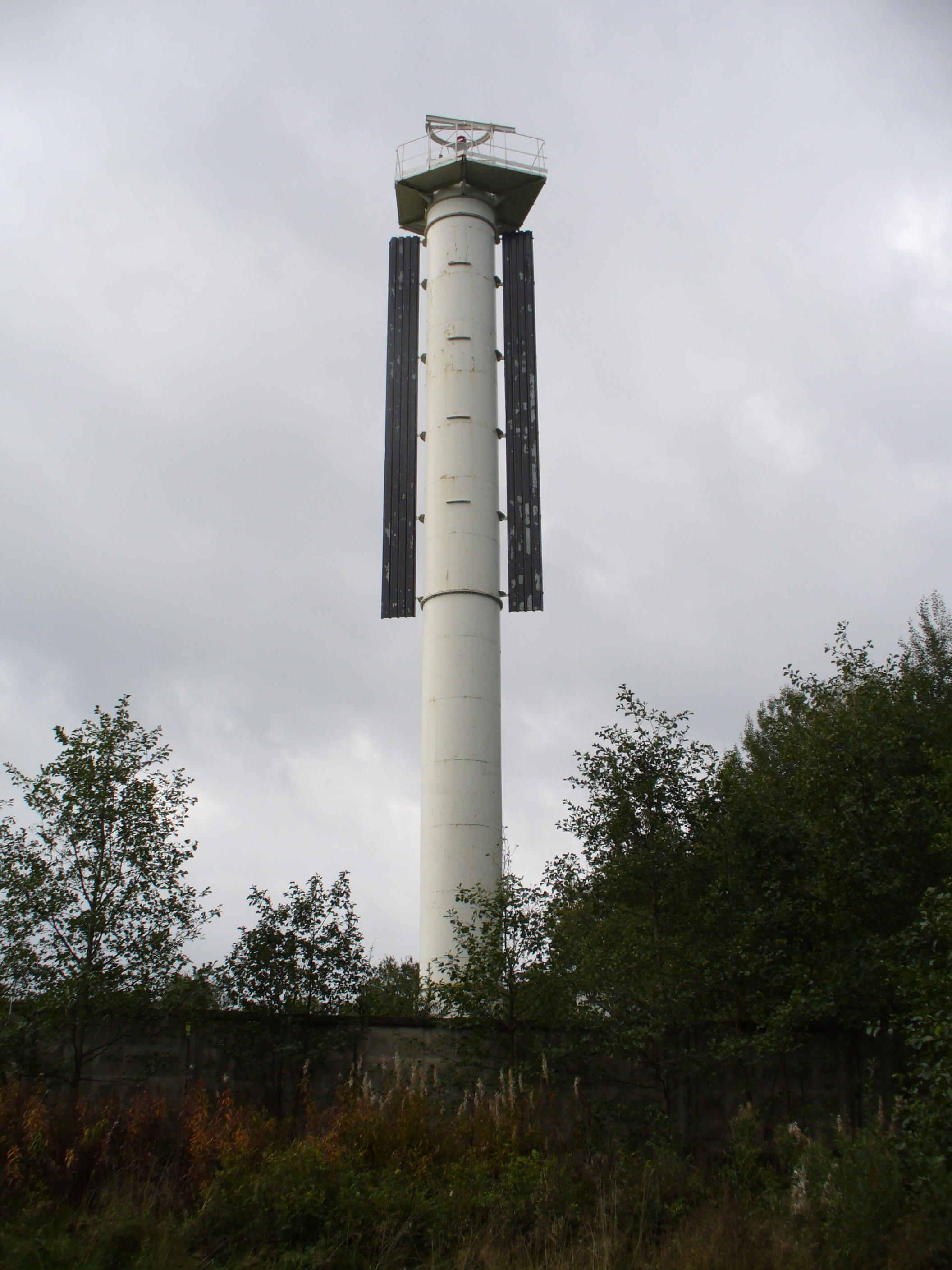
Kallavere lower lighthouse
