= Uusküla, Harju County =

Village in Estonia

Coordinates: 59°29′55″N 25°00′25″E

Uusküla
- Village
- Interactive map of Uusküla
- Country: Estonia
- County: Harju County
- Parish: Jõelähtme Parish
- Time zone: UTC+2 (EET)
  - Summer (DST): UTC+3 (EEST)

Uusküla is a village in Jõelähtme Parish, Harju County in northern Estonia.

The northern half of the territory of Uusküla is occupied by the Port of Muuga.

== Name ==
Uusküla was attested in historical sources as Niege bue in 1491, Nyebue in 1529, UhsKylla in 1693, and Uekül in 1798. The name literally means 'new village', and Uusküla is believed to be a "daughter village" of neighboring Kallavere.
