= Lake Maardu =

Lake in Estonia

- Maardu järv (Estonian)
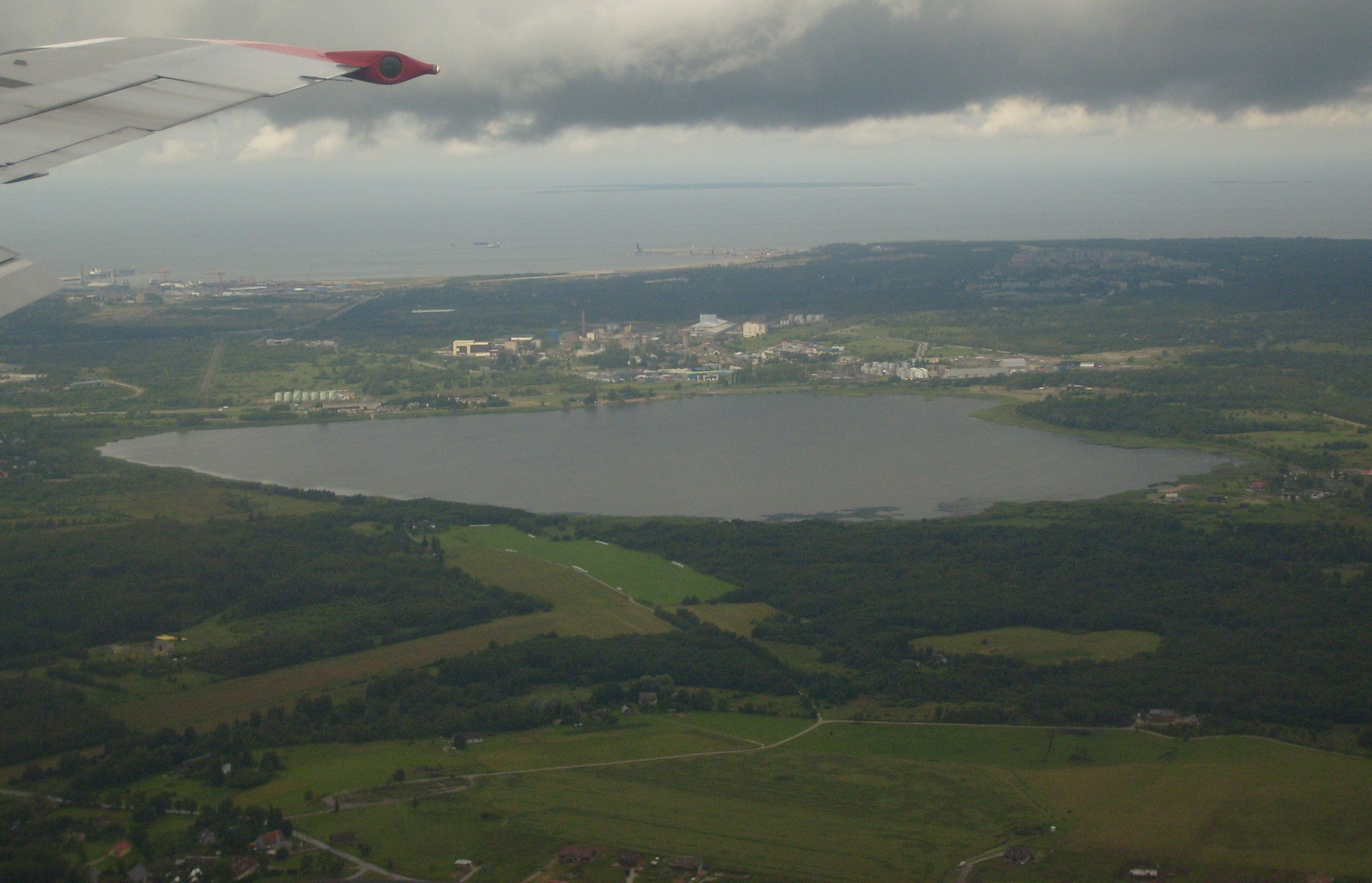
- Lake Maardu from the south

- Location within Estonia
- Location: Maardu, Harju County
- Coordinates: 59°26′49″N 24°59′51″E
- Primary outflows: Kroodi stream
- Catchment area: 13.4 km^{2} (5.2 sq mi; 3,300 acres)
- Max. length: 1,730 meters (5,680 ft)
- Max. width: 920 meters (3,020 ft)
- Surface area: 161.8 hectares (400 acres)
- Average depth: 1.6 meters (5 ft 3 in)
- Max. depth: 3.3 meters (11 ft)
- Water volume: 2,736,000 cubic meters (96,600,000 cu ft)
- Shore length^{1}: 5,940 meters (19,490 ft)
- Surface elevation: 33.5 meters (110 ft)
- Settlements: Maardu
- ^{1} Shore length is not a well-defined measure.

Lake Maardu (Estonian: Maardu järv; also Liivakandi järv 'Lake Liivakandi') is a lake in northern Estonia. It is located in the town of Maardu in Harju County. The village of Maardu with Maardu Manor is located on the southeastern side of the lake.

== Physical description ==
The lake has an area of 161.8 hectares (400 acres). The lake has an average depth of 1.6 meters (5 ft 3 in) and a maximum depth of 3.3 meters (11 ft). It is 1,730 meters (5,680 ft) long, and its shoreline measures 5,940 meters (19,490 ft). It has a volume of 2,736,000 cubic meters (96,600,000 cu ft). The lake is 33.5 meters (110 ft) above sea level.

== History ==
Lake Maardu was a natural body of water before 1894, when the landowner of Maardu Manor, Otto von Brevern, dug a ditch (Kroodi Creek) to the sea and the lake was emptied. It was restored in 1939.

== See also ==
- List of lakes of Estonia
