= Ihasalu Bay =

Bay in Estonia

Coordinates: 59.500°N 25.134°E

Ihasalu Bay (Estonian: Ihasalu laht) is bay in Harju County, Estonia.

Muuga Bay is part of Ihasalu Bay.

The bay's maximum depth is 85 m.
