= Maardu (village) =

Village in Estonia

- Village
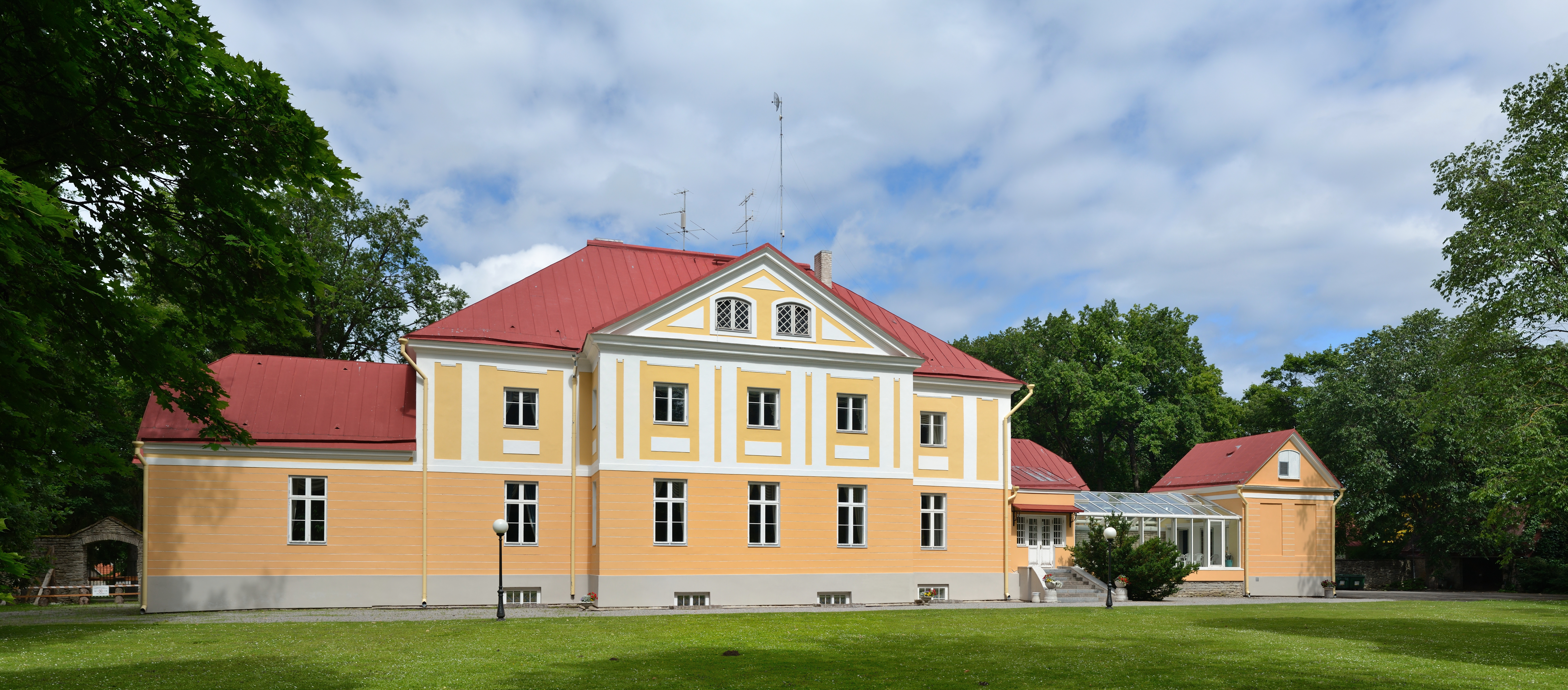
- Maardu Manor house

- Location in Estonia
- Coordinates: 59°25′55″N 25°01′01″E
- Country: Estonia
- County: Harju County
- Municipality: Jõelähtme Parish
- First mentioned: 1241

Population (01.01.2010)
  - Total: 123

Maardu is a village in Jõelähtme Parish, Harju County in northern Estonia. It is located southeast of the town of Maardu, just behind Lake Maardu. Maardu has a population of 123 (as of 1 January 2010).

Maardu Manor (German: Maart) is located in the village.

Maardu was first mentioned in 1241 (Martækilæ) and the manor in 1397.

== Notable people ==
Notable people that were born or lived in Maardu include:

- Evald Hermaküla (1941–2000), actor, born in Maardu

== Gallery ==
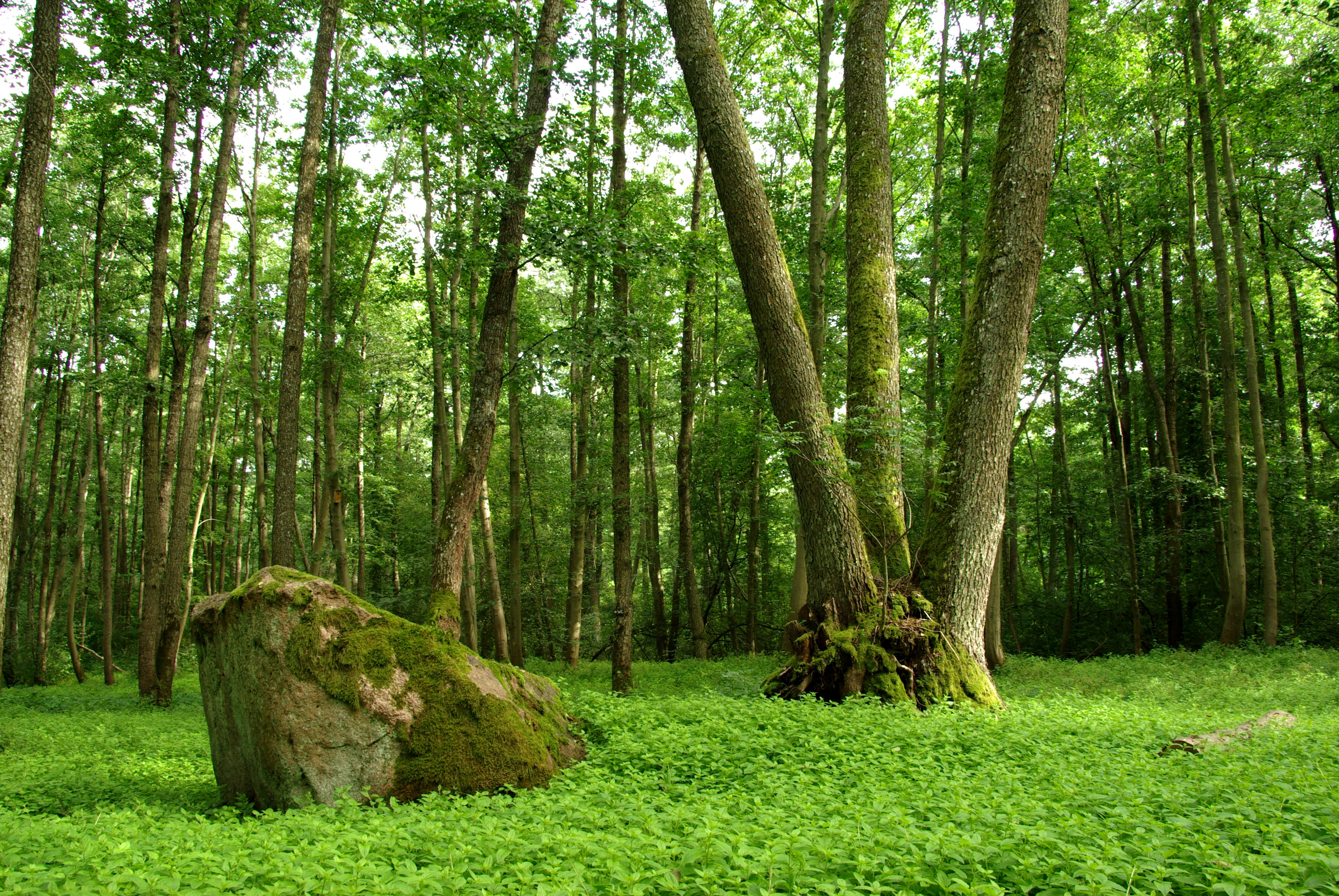
Maardu hiis, a sacred grove in Maardu.
