= Kallavere =

Village in Estonia

- Village
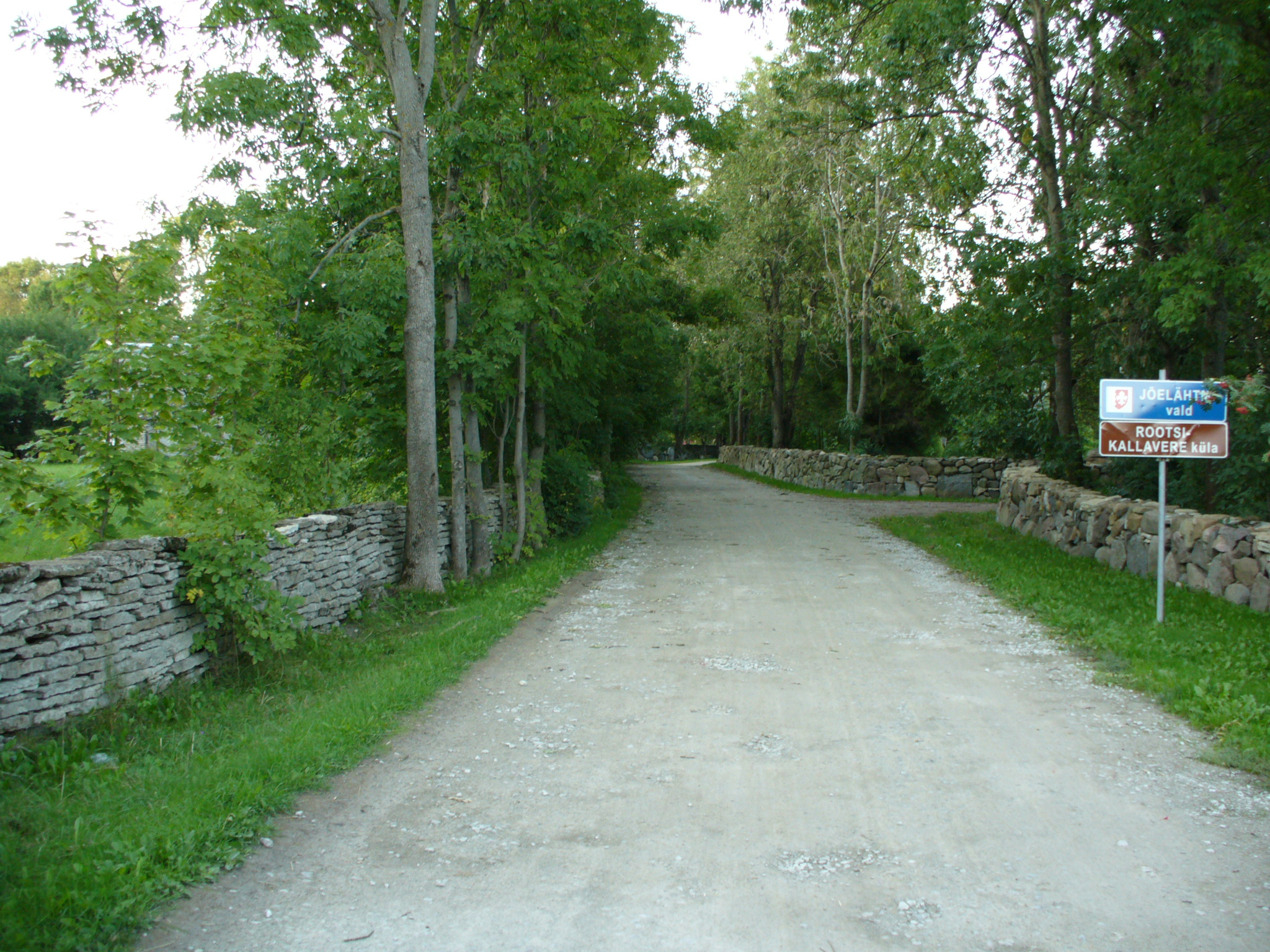
- Street in Kallavere.

- Location in Estonia
- Coordinates: 59°29′00″N 25°02′36″E
- Country: Estonia
- County: Harju County
- Municipality: Jõelähtme Parish
- First mentioned: 1241

Population (01.01.2010)
  - Total: 142

Kallavere is a village in Jõelähtme Parish, Harju County in northern Estonia. It's located about 17 km (11 mi) northeast of Tallinn, just east of Kallavere, the main part the town of Maardu. Kallavere village has a population of 142 (as of 1 January 2010).

The village is entirely located on the Rebala Heritage Reserve.

Kallavere was first mentioned in the Danish Census Book in 1241. But it's also possible that Kallavere was already mentioned in 1154 by al-Idrisi as Qlwry.

In the 1950s a new housing estate was built on the former lands of Kallavere village on the western part which administratively went under the rule of the town Maardu but also bears the name of Kallavere.

On 19 April 2010 part of the northern part of the village was detached to establish a new official village Saviranna.

== Notable people ==
- Margus Metstak (born 1961), basketball player

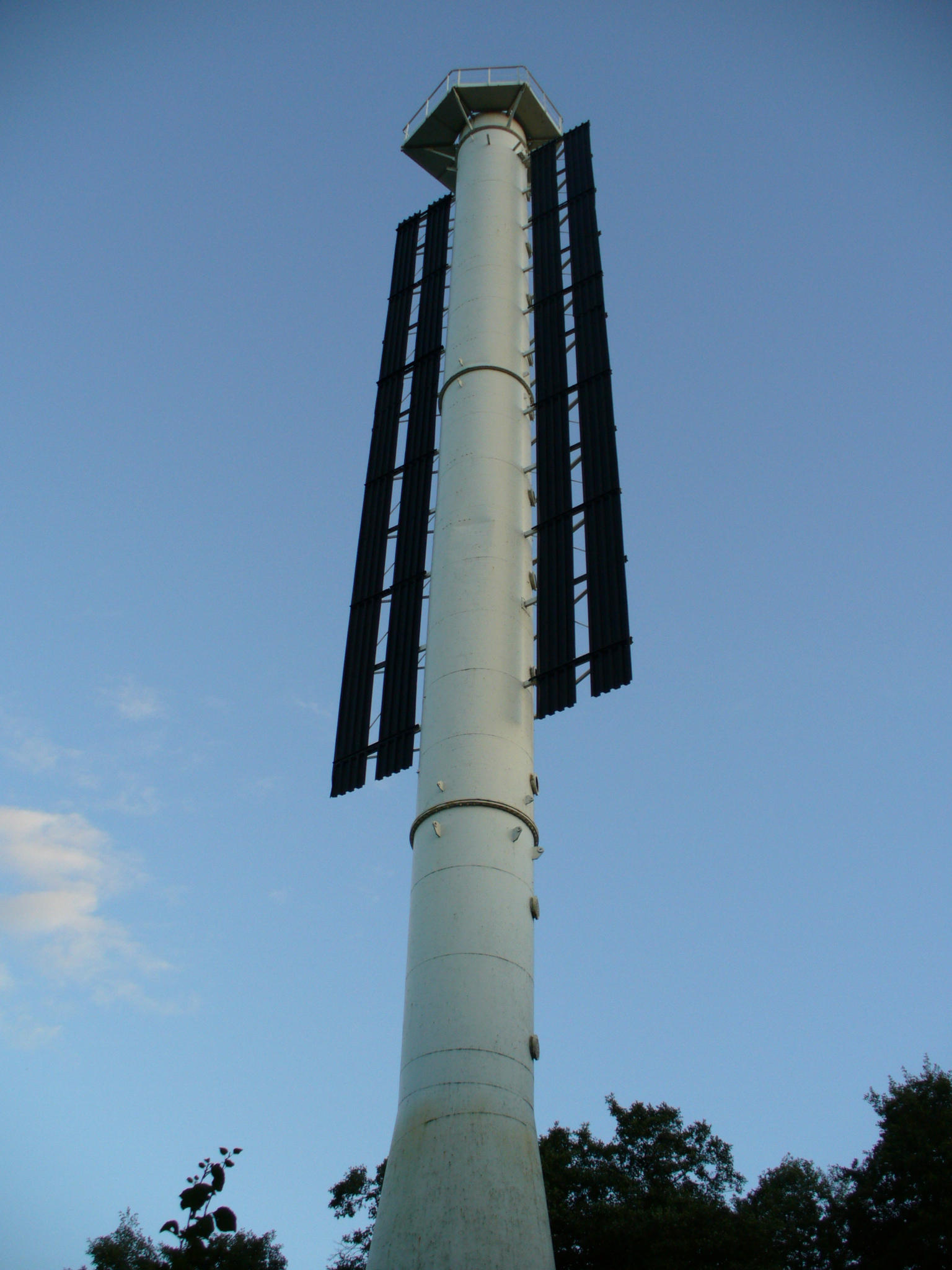
Kallavere upper lighthouse
