= Muuga aedlinn =

District of Maardu, Estonia

Coordinates: 59°28′35.37″N 24°56′21.97″E

Muuga aedlinn (lit. 'Muuga Garden City') is a residential area in the western part of the town of Maardu, Estonia. It is located just east of Tallinn's Pirita district.

The development of Muuga aedlinn has been active since the 1950s. At first it was mainly covered with summer cottages. Since the 1990s it has gradually changed into a permanent residential area.

Muuga aedlinn is reachable from the centre of Tallinn by Tallinn Bus Company's route no. 34 (Viru Keskus – Muuga aedlinn), average traveling time is about 30 minutes.

== Gallery ==
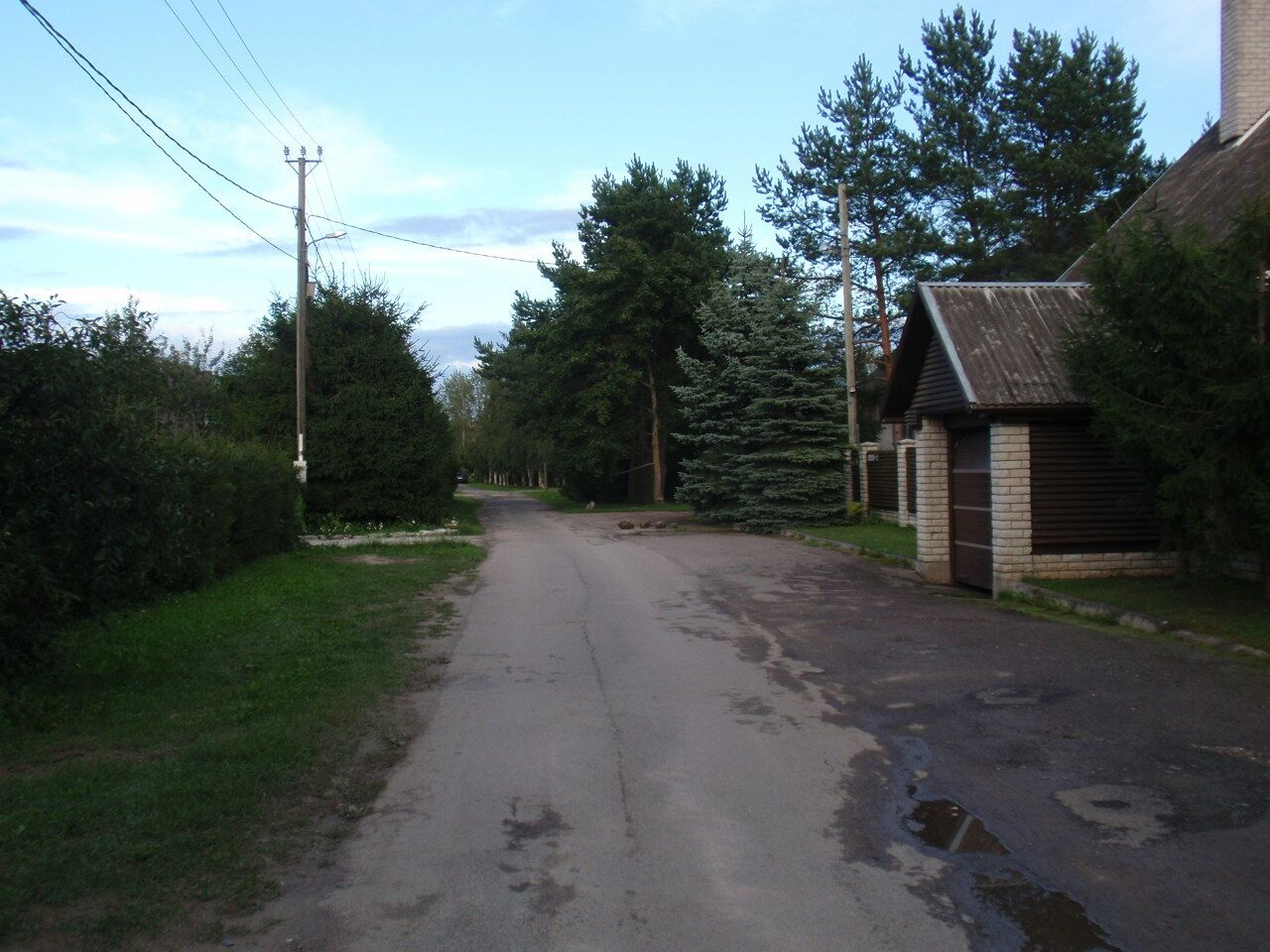
There are few paved streets in Muuga aedlinn, Pirnipuu puiestee is one of them.

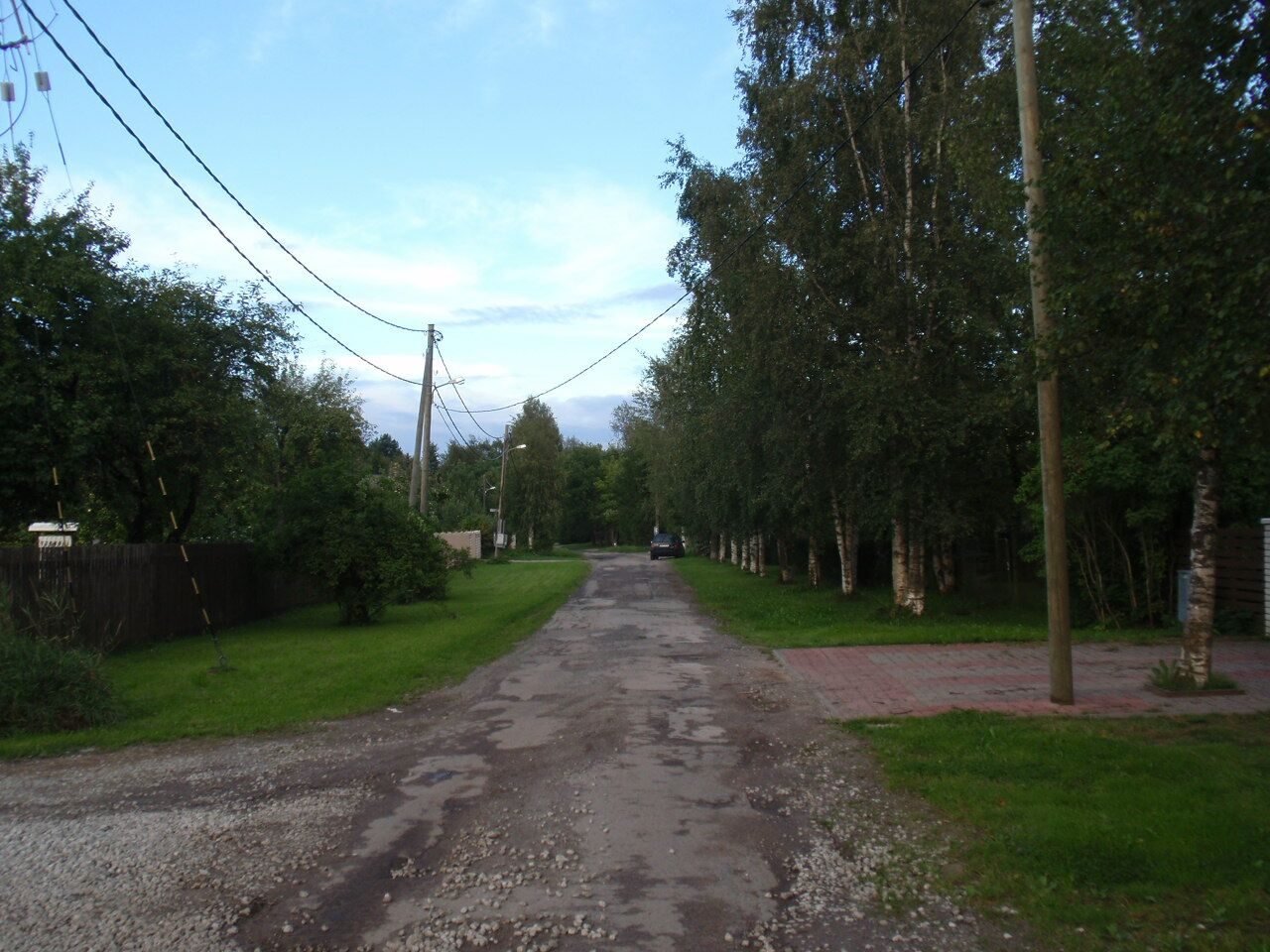

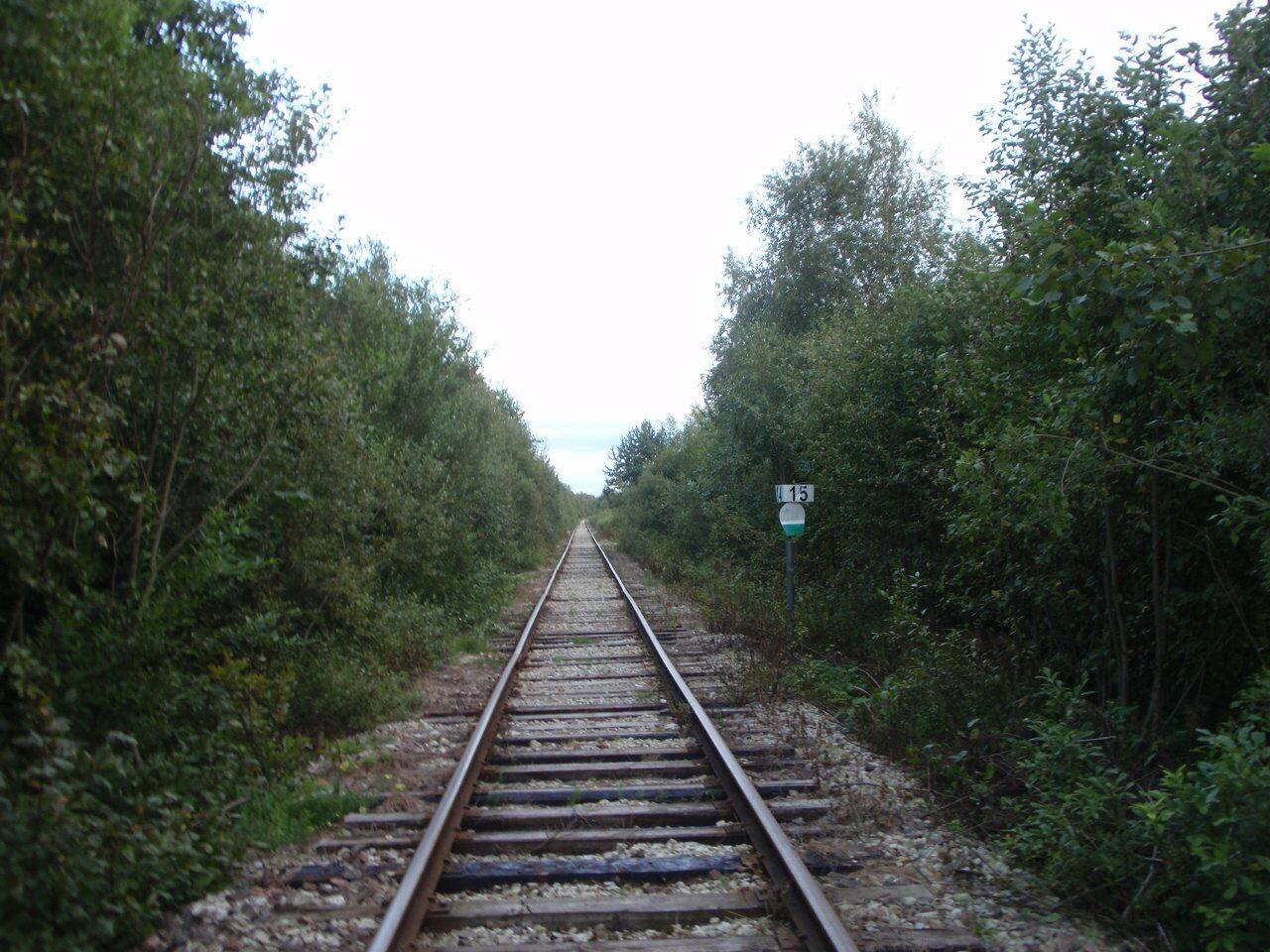
Maardu–Miiduranna railway in Muuga aedlinn
