= Muuga Bay =

Bay in Estonia

Coordinates: 59.507°N 24.953°E

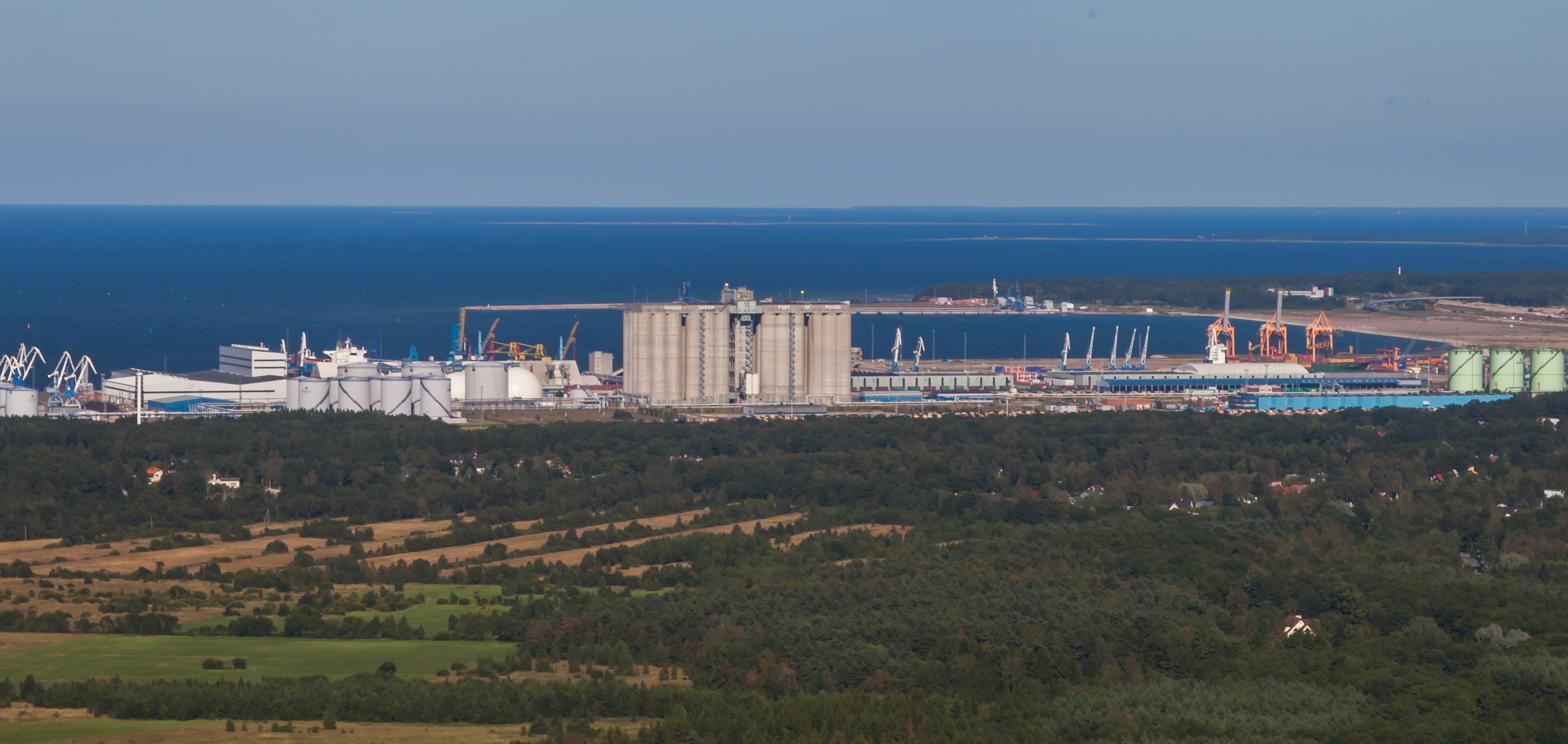
Muuga Bay and Muuga Harbour

Muuga Bay (Estonian: Muuga laht, or Estonian: Randvere laht) is bay in Harju County, Estonia. Muuga Bay is part of Ihasalu Bay. Area of Muuga Bay is 3366 ha.

Several islets are located on the bay, e.g. Lahesaar.

Muuga Harbour is located at the bay.
