= Maardu =

Town in Harju County, Estonia

- Town
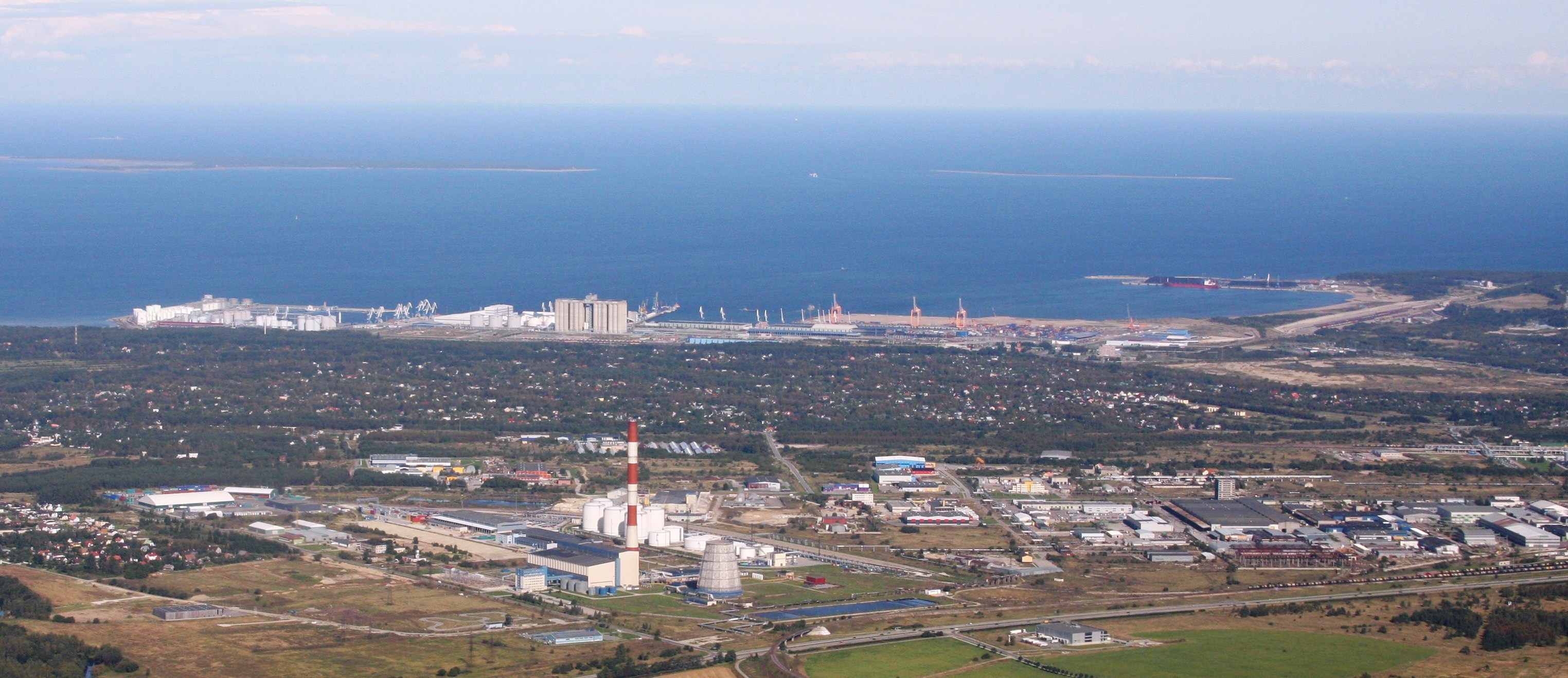
- Panorama of Maardu, Port of Muuga in the background. The Iru Power Plant is in the foreground.

- Flag Coat of arms

- Location in Estonia
- Coordinates: 59°28′41″N 25°00′58″E
- Country: Estonia
- County: Harju County
- First mentioned: 1241
- Borough rights: 1951
- Town rights: 1980

Government
  - Mayor: Vladimir Arhipov (Estonian Centre Party)

Area
  - Total: 22.76 km^{2} (8.79 sq mi)
- Elevation: 20 m (66 ft)

Population (2026)
  - Total: 16,812
  - Rank: 7th
  - Density: 738.7/km^{2} (1,913/sq mi)
- Postal code: 74111
- ISO 3166 code: EE-446
- Website: www.maardu.ee

Maardu (Estonian: [ˈmɑːrd̥u], German: Maart) is a town and a municipality in Harju County, Estonia. It is part of Tallinn metropolitan area, located about 15 kilometres (9.3 mi) east of the capital city. The town covers an area of 22.76 km^{2} and has a population of 16,812 (as of 1 January 2026).

The Port of Muuga, the largest cargo port in Estonia, is partly located in Maardu.

According to the 2000 Census, the population was 16,738. 61.7% were Russians, 19.9% Estonians, 6.6% Ukrainians, 5.7% Belarusians, 1.5% Tatars. The proportion of Estonians was one of the lowest (if not the lowest) in Central and Western Estonia.

Outside the town (in the village of Maardu), south of the road to Narva lies Maardu manor, one of the oldest preserved baroque manor houses in Estonia. It traces its origins to 1389, but the current building dates from the 1660s with additions made in the 19th century. The landlord of the manor Herman Jensen Bohn in 1739 funded the printing of the first bible printed in Estonian.

== History ==
The area around Maardu has been inhabited since at least the medieval period. The settlement was recorded in 1241, while Maardu manor appears in historical records from 1389.

Maardu's development as an industrial settlement began in the late 1930's. In 1939 construction started on a phosphate processing facility operated by Eesti Fosforit near Kroodi, on part of the land owned by the Maardu Manor. The industrial complex expanded after the Second World War, and a chemical plant began operating in 1949. The growth of the mining and chemical industries lead to the expansion of the surrounding settlement.In 1951, Maardu was granted Urban-type settlement status. It received city statues in 1980. During the Soviet period, it's administrative affiliations changed several times, including a transfer to Tallinn's Maritime District in 1962. In 1993, Maardu became an independent municipality.

Industrial production had a considerable environmental impact on the area. Dust emissions from mining and pollution associated with chemical manufacturing affected local air, soil, and water quality. Environmental concerns became increasingly prominent during the late 80's, when the Tallinn Green Movement developed as an initiative known as "Green Maardu" in 1989.

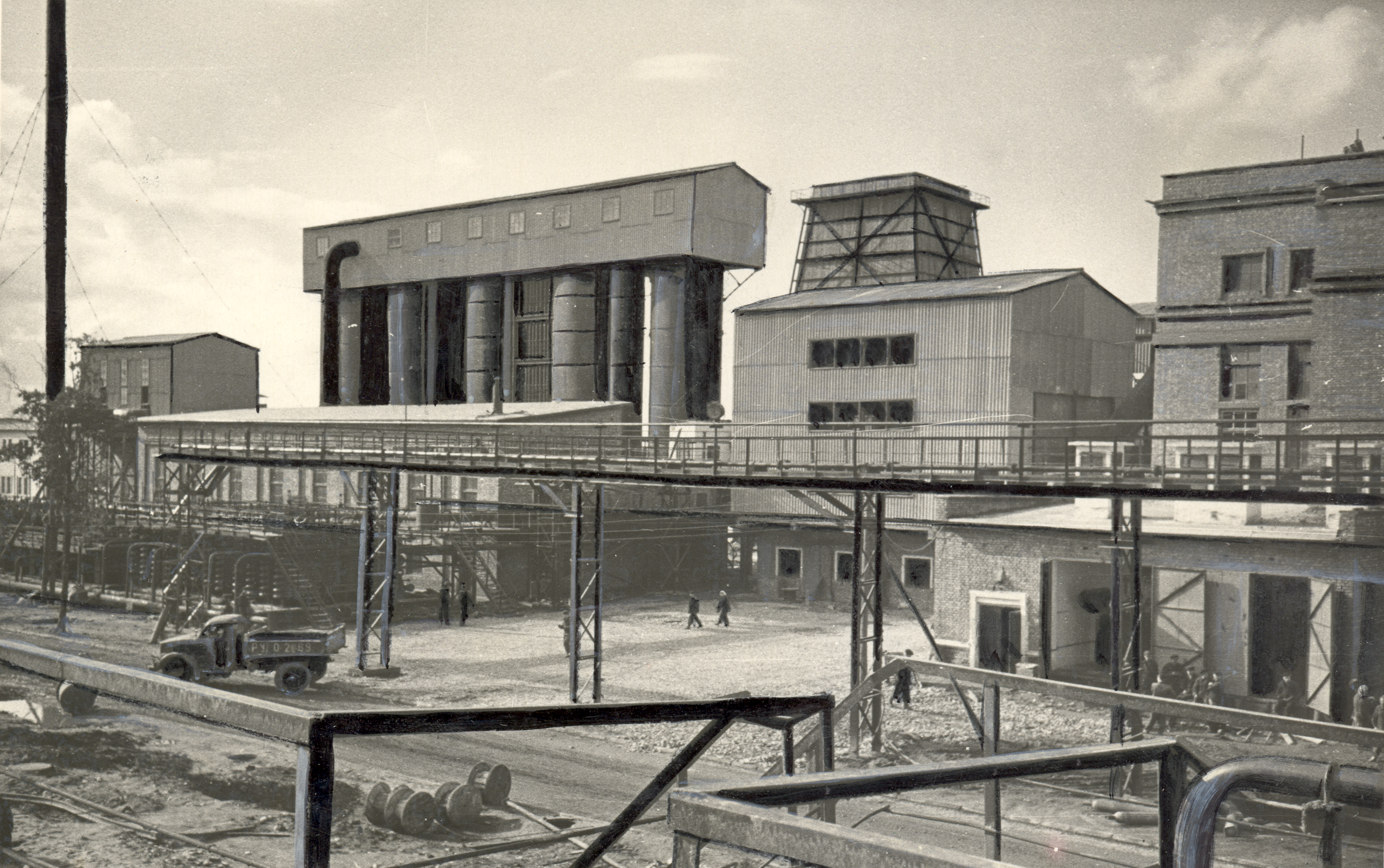
Maardu chemical plant, 1955

The expansion of Muuga Harbor contributed to the subsequent development of Maardu's residential areas, particularly Kallavere, which became the city's main urban center

== Maardu neighborhoods ==
Maardu may be divided into six parts:

- Kallavere (the centre of the city where most of the public institutions are located)
- Muuga Harbour
- Muuga aedlinn (former garden city, now a light residential suburb more connected to Tallinn than Kallavere)
- Kärmu (industrial area)
- Kroodi (industrial area)
- Lake Maardu

== Demographics ==
Ethnic composition 1959-2021
Ethnicity	1959		1970		1979		1989		2000		2011		2021	
Ethnicity	amount	%	amount	%	amount	%	amount	%	amount	%	amount	%	amount	%
Estonians	1475	34.9	2110	30.7	2167	21.7	2479	15.4	3331	19.9	4347	24.8	3746	23.2
Russians	-	-	3254	47.3	5656	56.7	10024	62.4	10331	61.7	10845	61.9	10037	62.1
Ukrainians	-	-	298	4.33	584	5.86	1269	7.91	1101	6.58	861	4.91	957	5.92
Belarusians	-	-	763	11.1	942	9.45	1281	7.98	949	5.67	660	3.77	536	3.31
Finns	-	-	144	2.09	139	1.39	133	0.83	144	0.86	88	0.50	62	0.38
Jews	-	-	19	0.28	28	0.28	24	0.15	19	0.11	20	0.11	13	0.08
Latvians	-	-	19	0.28	27	0.27	37	0.23	36	0.22	34	0.19	42	0.26
Germans	-	-	-	-	27	0.27	42	0.26	31	0.19	27	0.15	25	0.15
Tatars	-	-	-	-	169	1.70	267	1.66	245	1.46	168	0.96	156	0.96
Poles	-	-	-	-	73	0.73	86	0.54	93	0.56	86	0.49	85	0.53
Lithuanians	-	-	24	0.35	36	0.36	51	0.32	79	0.47	82	0.47	78	0.48
unknown	0	0.00	0	0.00	0	0.00	0	0.00	93	0.56	14	0.08	80	0.49
other	2748	65.1	246	3.58	122	1.22	359	2.24	286	1.71	292	1.67	353	2.18
Total	4223	100	6877	100	9970	100	16052	100	16738	100	17524	100	16170	100

== Religion ==
Out of older than fifteen years residents of Maardu, 53.2 per cent are religiously unaffiliated, 35.7 per cent identify as Orthodox, Lutherans make up 4.4 per cent of the population, other Christians 3.7 per cent and 2.5 per cent of the population follows other religions or did not specify their religious affiliation.

== Sports ==
Maardu is home to the football club Maardu Linnameeskond, who play's they're home matches at Maardu linnastaadion, a 500 seat stadium within the city.

== Gallery ==
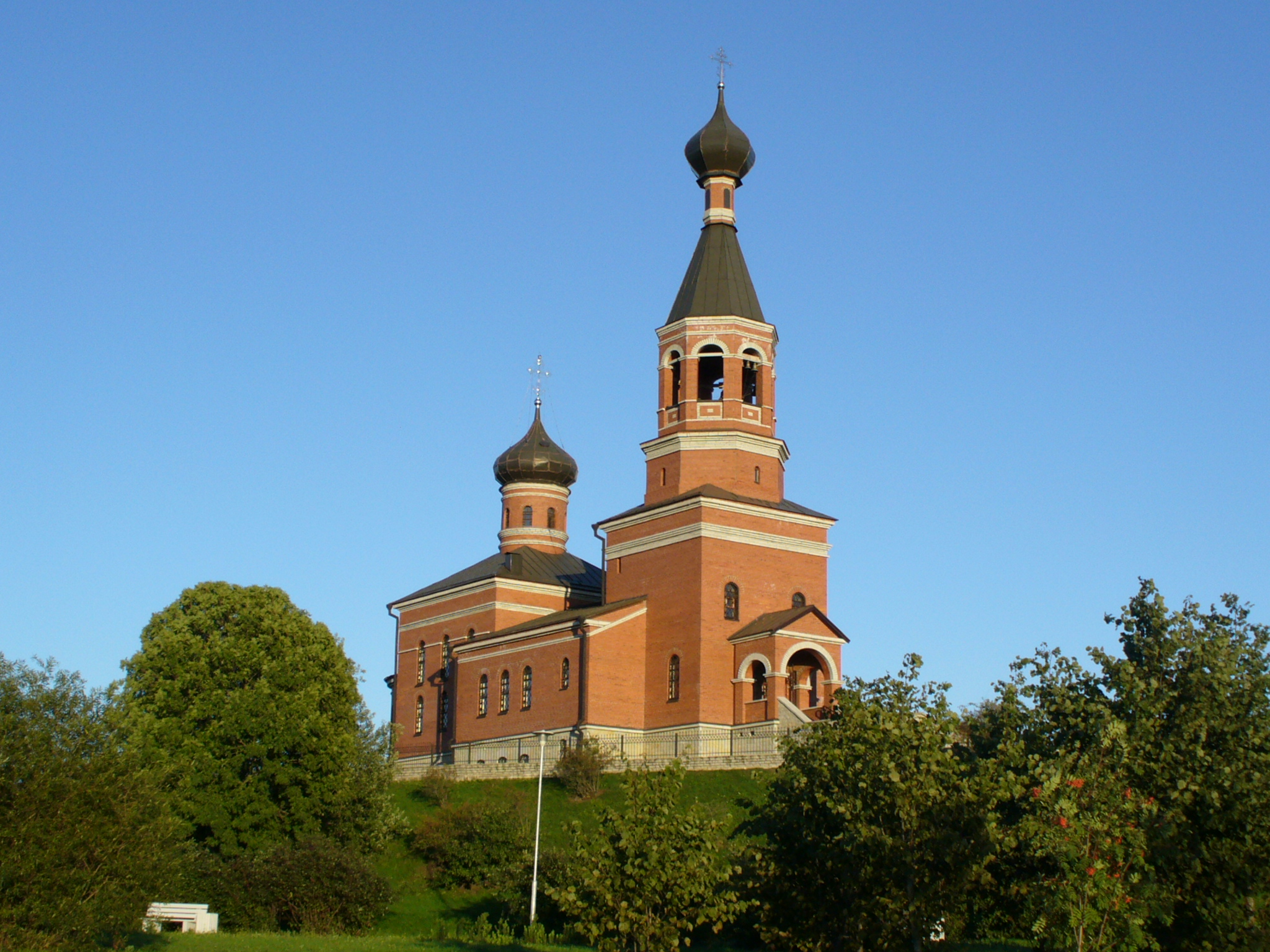
Maardu Archangel Michael Church

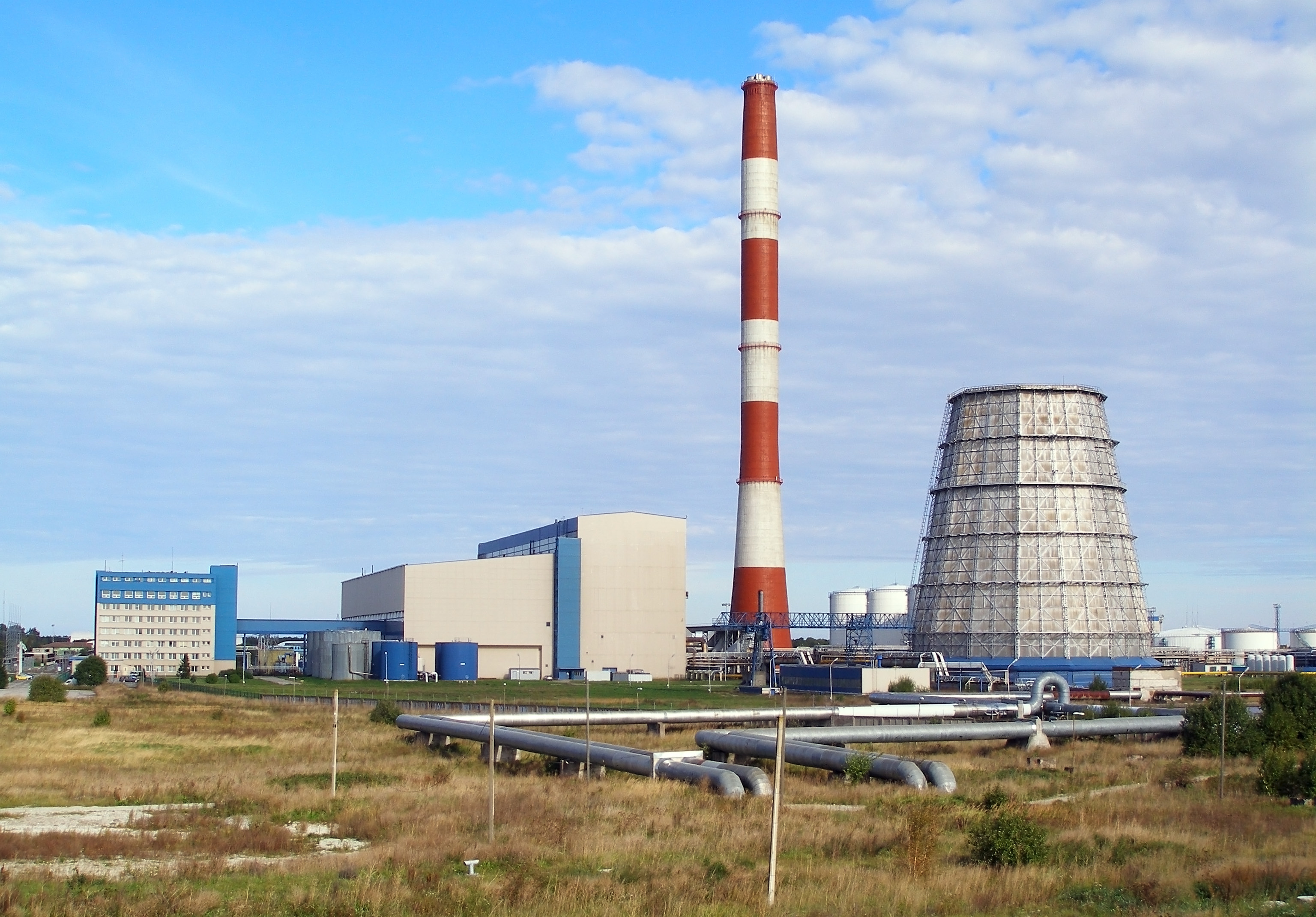
Iru thermal power plant

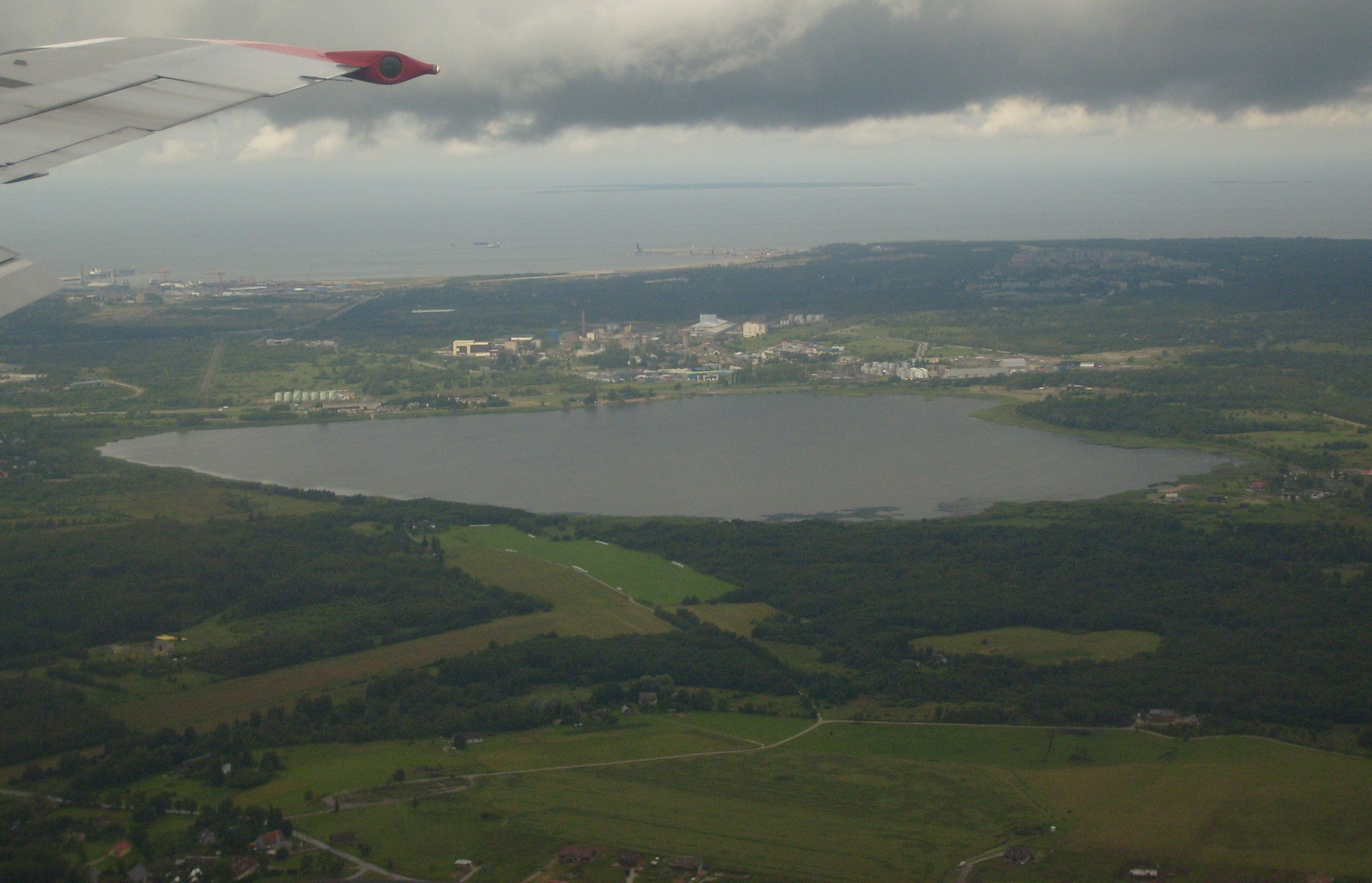
Lake Maardu

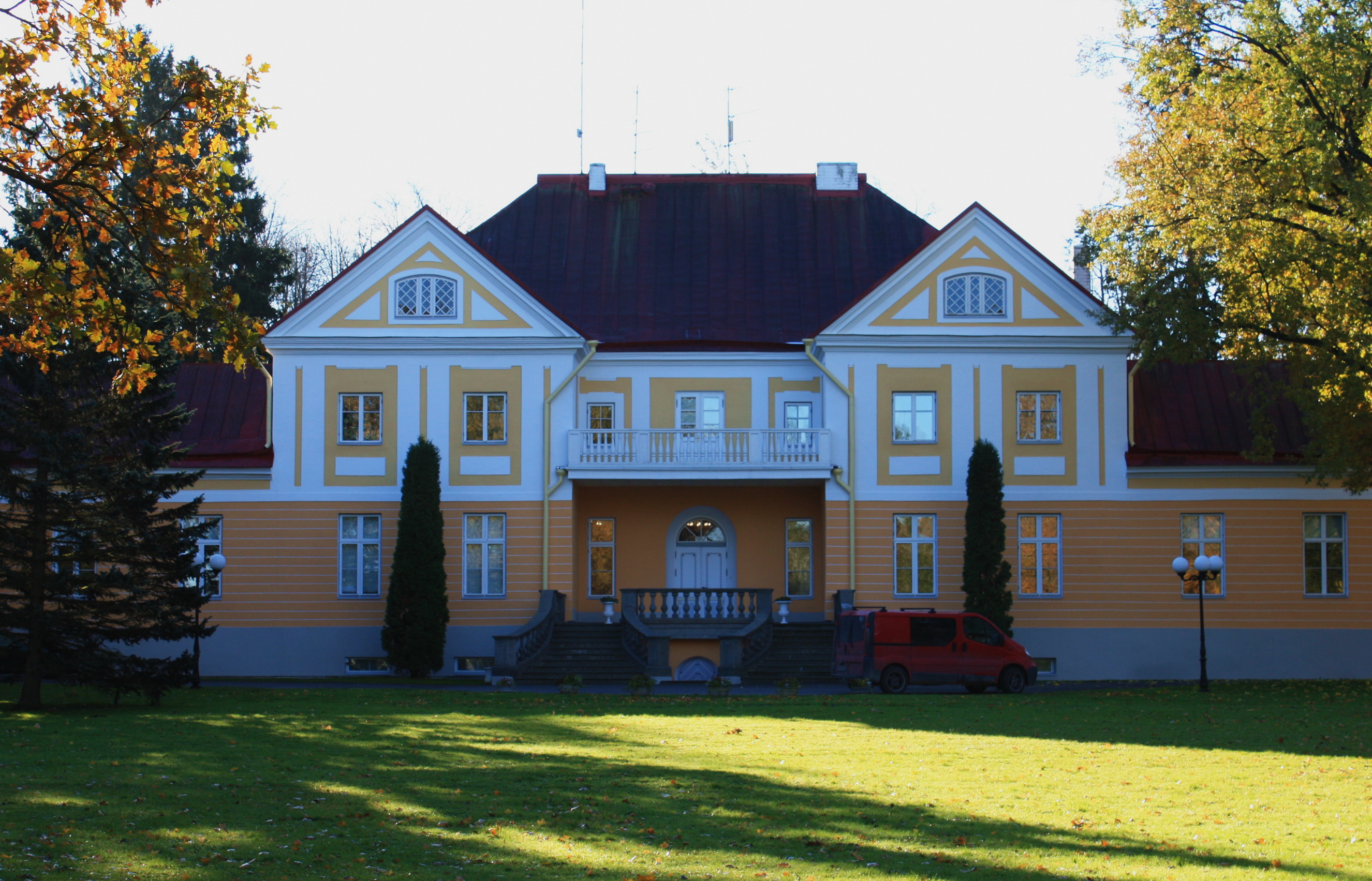
Maardu manor house

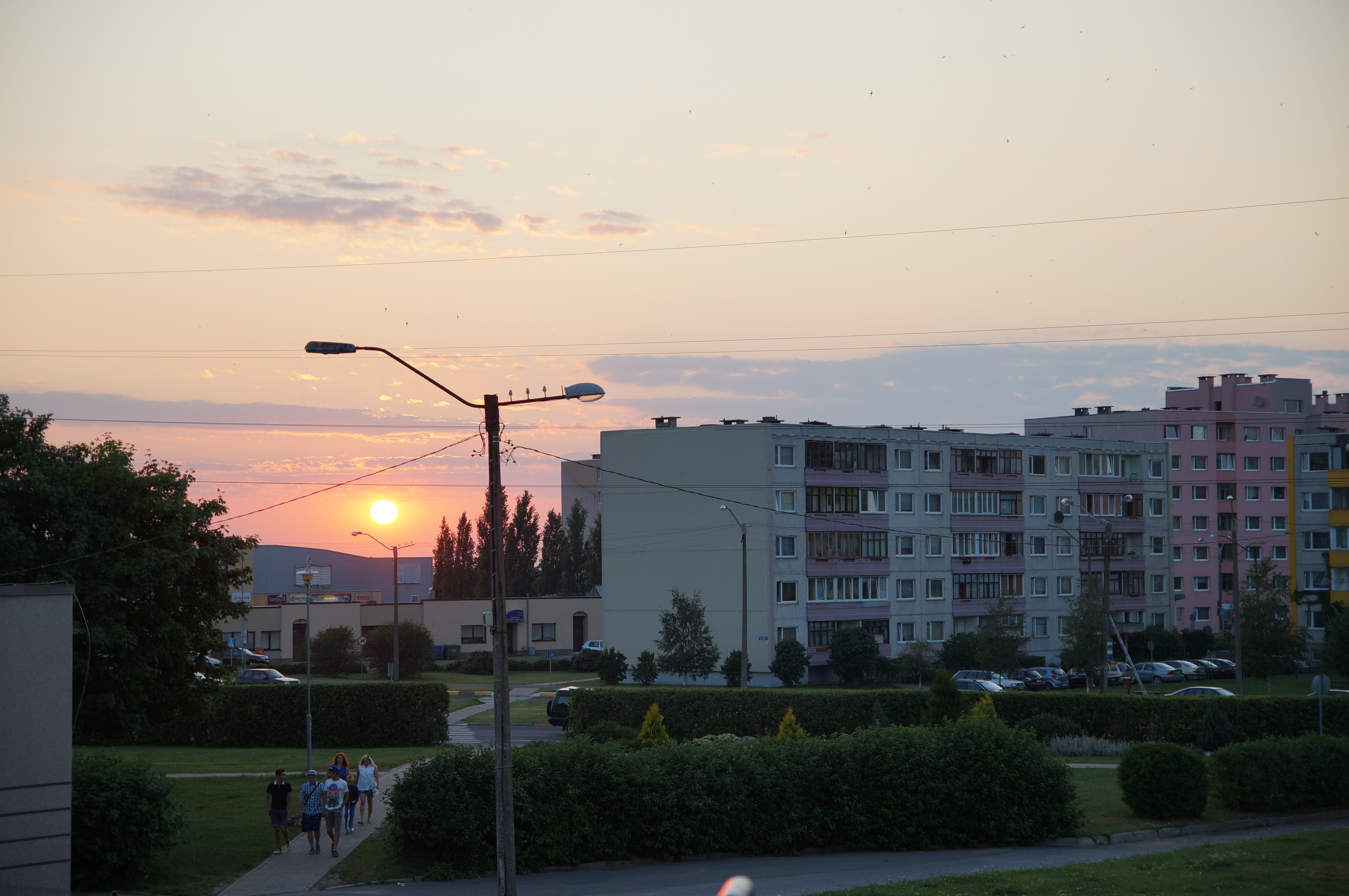
Apartment buildings at sunset

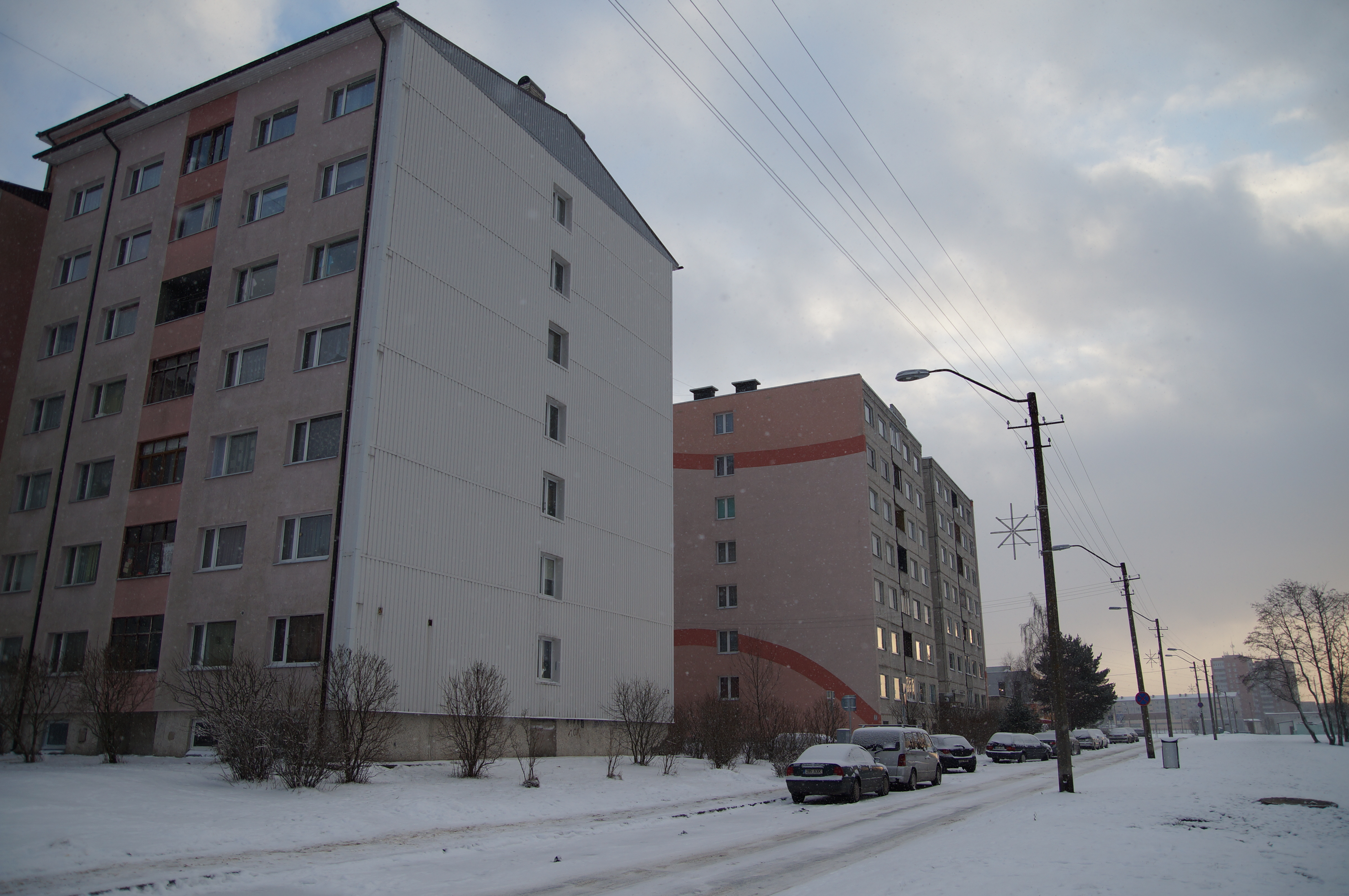
Soviet-era apartment buildings

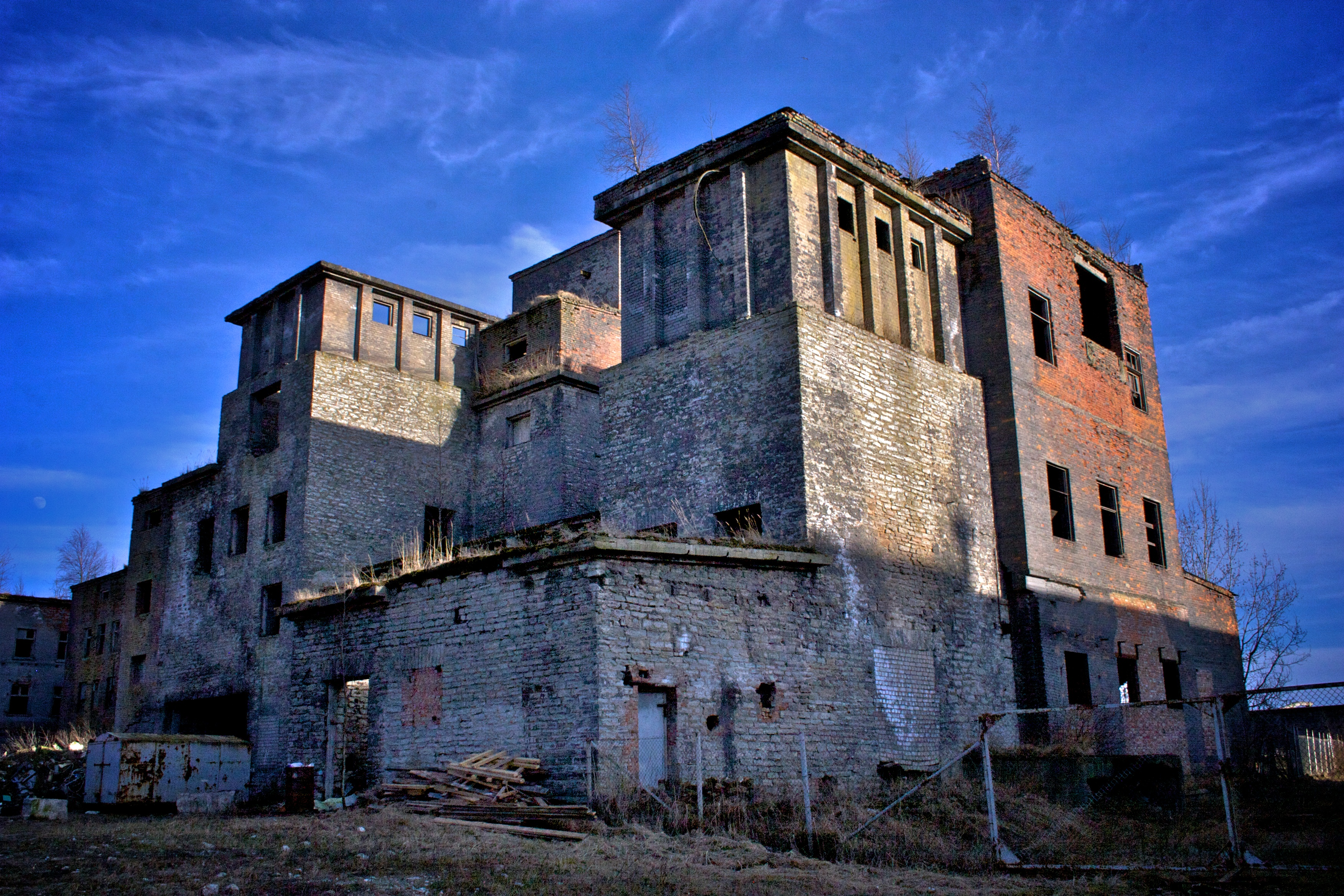
Abandoned factory building in Maardu

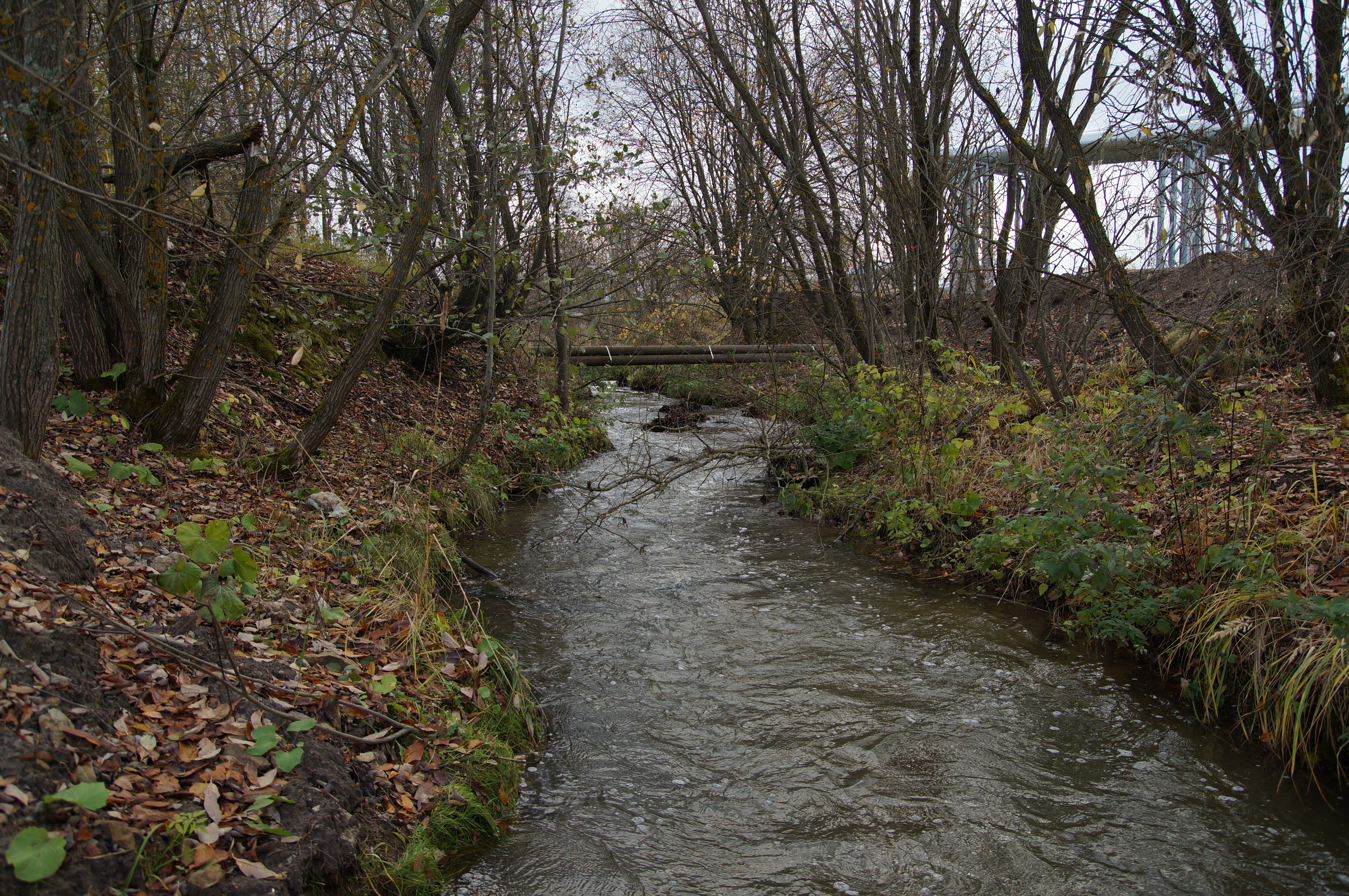
Kroodi creek

== See also ==
- Maardu Linnameeskond
- Maardu United
