= Muuga Harbour =

Harbor in Estonia

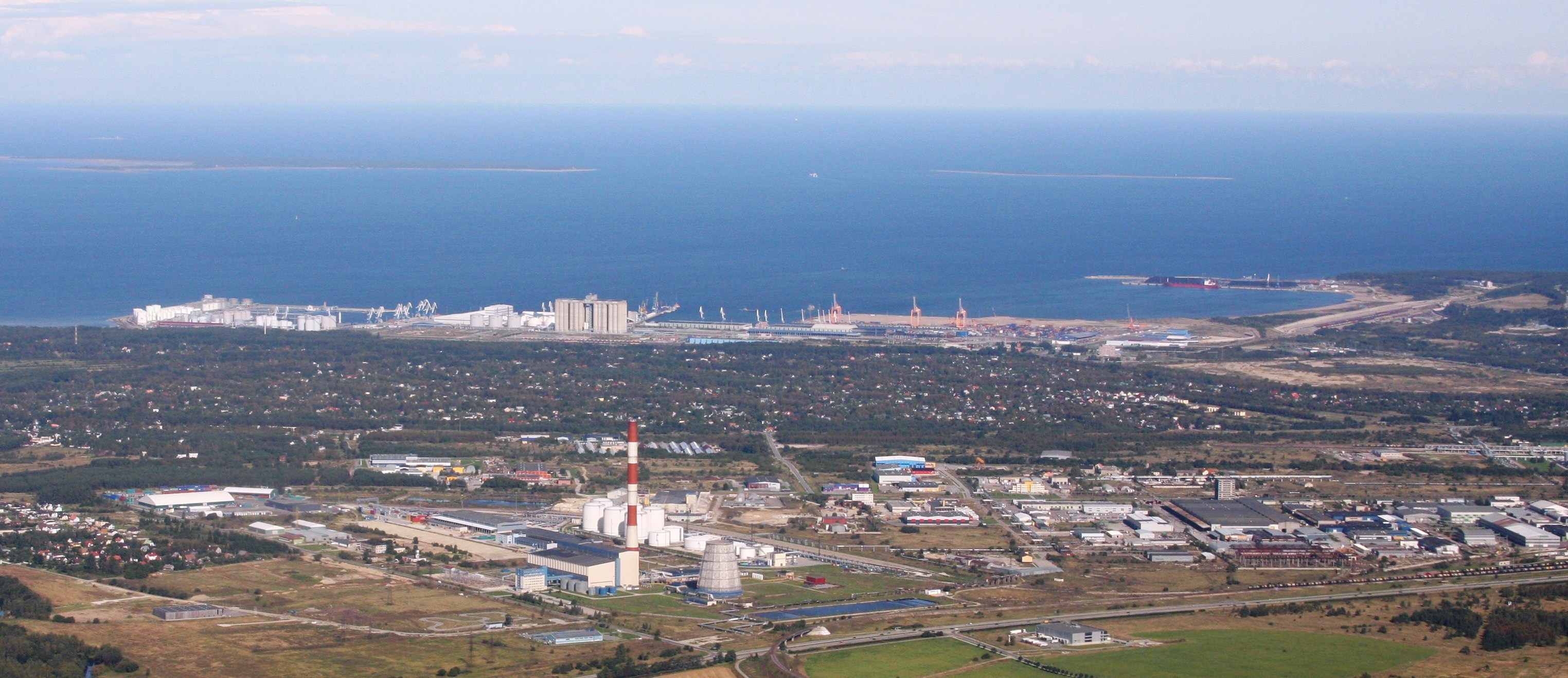
- Aerial view of the Muuga Harbour
- Interactive map of Muuga Harbour

Location
- Country: Estonia
- Location: Viimsi and Jõelähtme parishes and Maardu
- Coordinates: 59°29′30″N 24°57′30″E
- UN/LOCODE: EE MUG

Details
- Opened: 1986
- Operated by: Port of Tallinn
- Type of Harbor: cargo port
- Size of harbour: 7.52 square kilometres (2.90 sq mi)
- Land area: 5.242 square kilometres (2.024 sq mi)
- No. of berths: 29

Statistics
- Annual container volume: 267,752 TEU's (2022)
- Passenger traffic: 201,000 (2024)
- Website www.portoftallinn.com/muuga-harbour

Muuga Harbour (Estonian: Muuga sadam) is the largest cargo port in Estonia, located on the southern coast of the Gulf of Finland, 17 kilometres (11 mi) northeast of the capital Tallinn, in Maardu. The harbour is administrated by Port of Tallinn, the biggest port authority in Estonia. Muuga Harbour is one of the few ice-free ports in northernmost Europe and among the deepest —up to 18 metres (59 ft) — and most modern ports in the Baltic Sea region. The cargo volume handled accounts for around 80% of the total cargo volume of Port of Tallinn and approximately 90% of the transit cargo volume passing through Estonia. Nearly 3/4 of cargo loaded in Muuga Harbour includes crude oil and oil products, but the harbour also serves dry bulk (mostly fertilizers, grain and coal) and other types of cargo.

Hamburg's HHLA has had a terminal in the port since 2018. This means that Muuga is networked with the ports of Hamburg, Odessa and Trieste via the logistics group HHLA, also with regard to the Silk Road.

The usual annual cargo traffic in the seaport is about 20–30 million tons. The harbour covers an area of 5.24 square kilometres (2.02 sq mi) on land and 7.5 square kilometres (2.9 sq mi) of water. Besides Maardu, the seaport also occupies land in the villages of Muuga and Uusküla.

There are 29 quays with a total length of 6.4 km (4.0 mi). The maximum depth is 18.0 m (59.1 ft). The largest tonnage of ship that can be accommodated is 300 by 48 metres (984 by 157 ft). There are 6 liquid bulk terminals, container, grain, coal, steel and a dry bulk terminals located in the port.

== Ships serving the terminal ==
Company	Ship	Route	Notes
(Finland) Eckerö Line	MS Finbo Cargo	Muuga – Vuosaari	

== Gallery ==
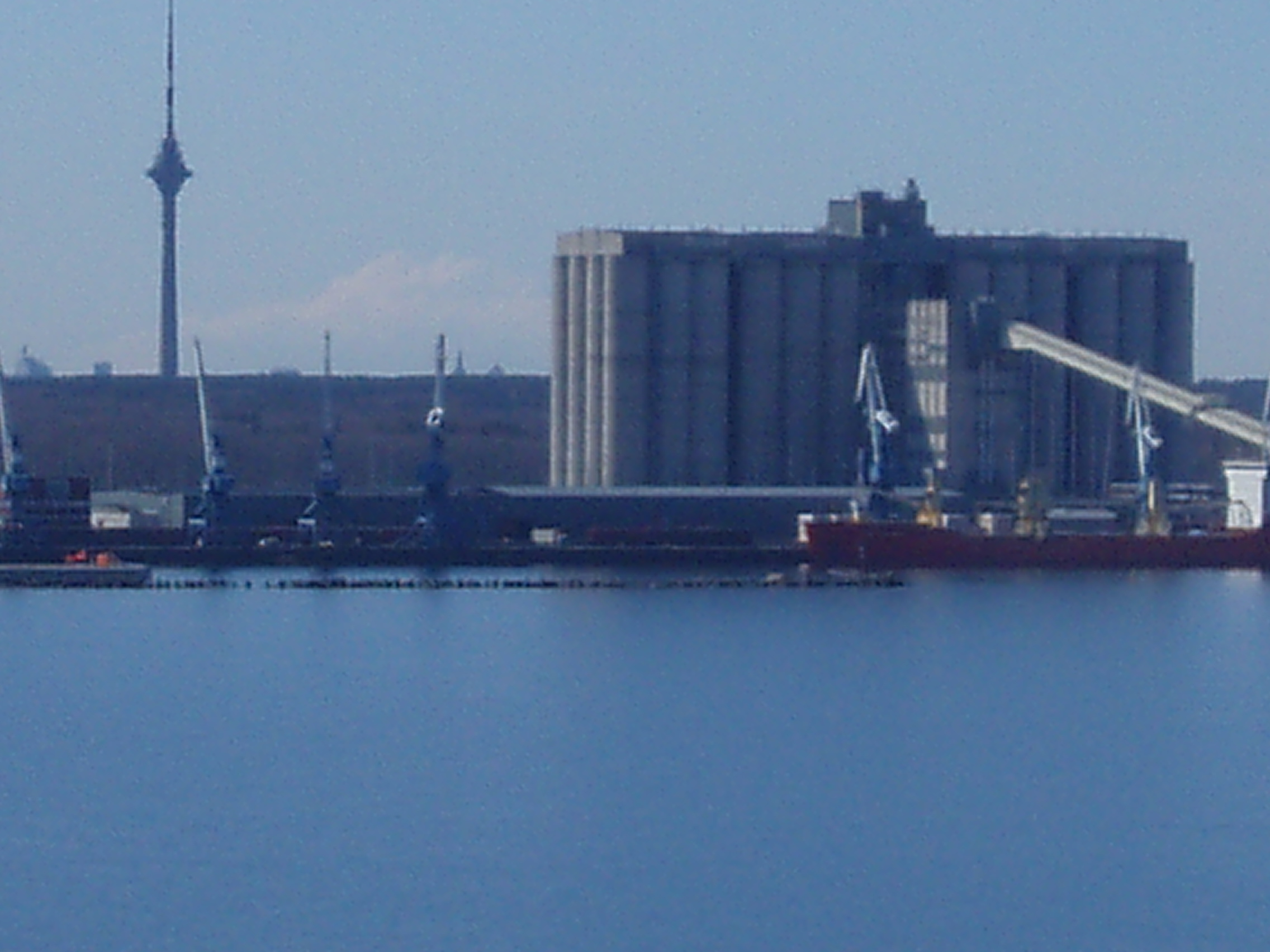
Grain terminal

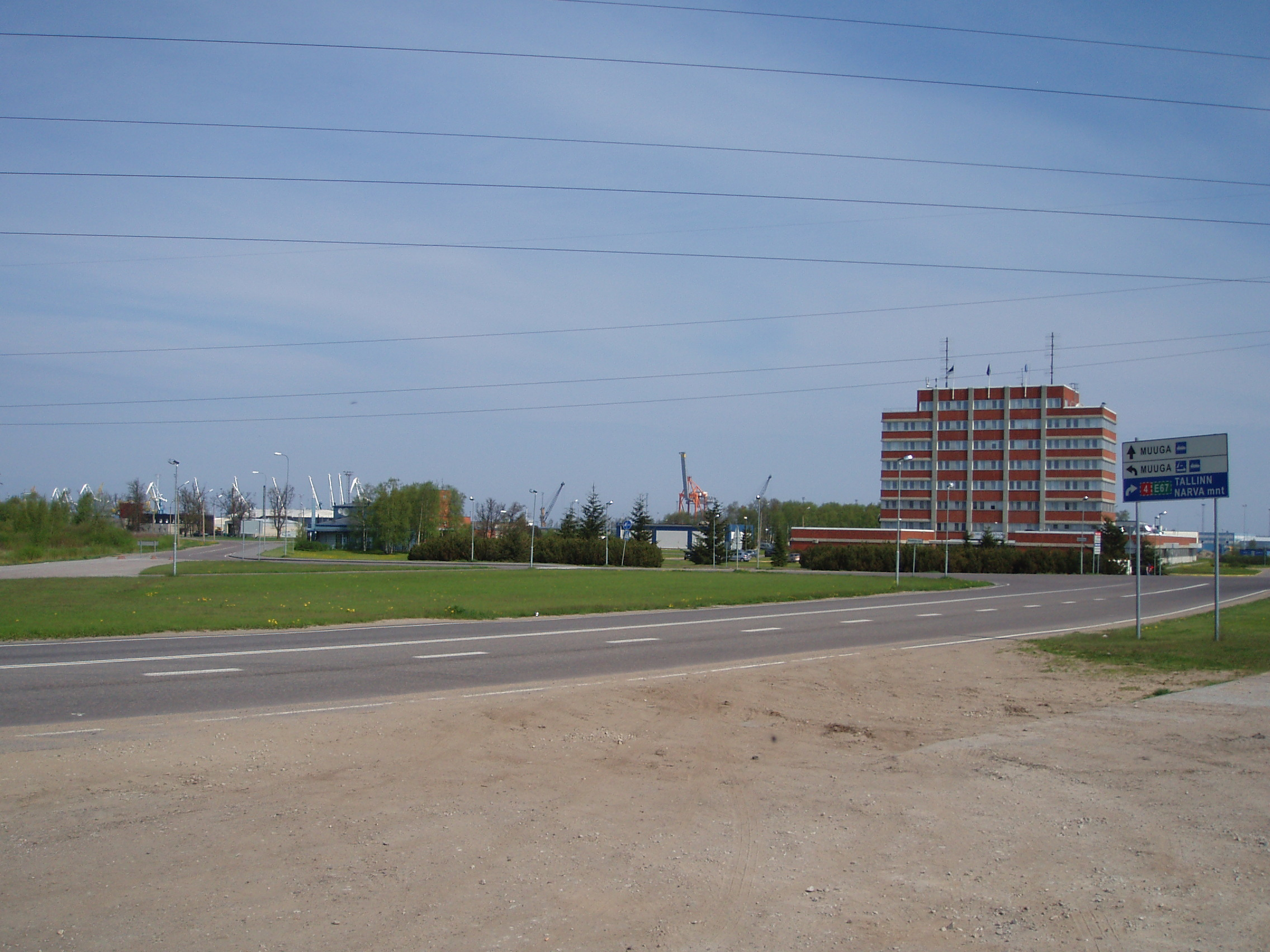
The headquarters

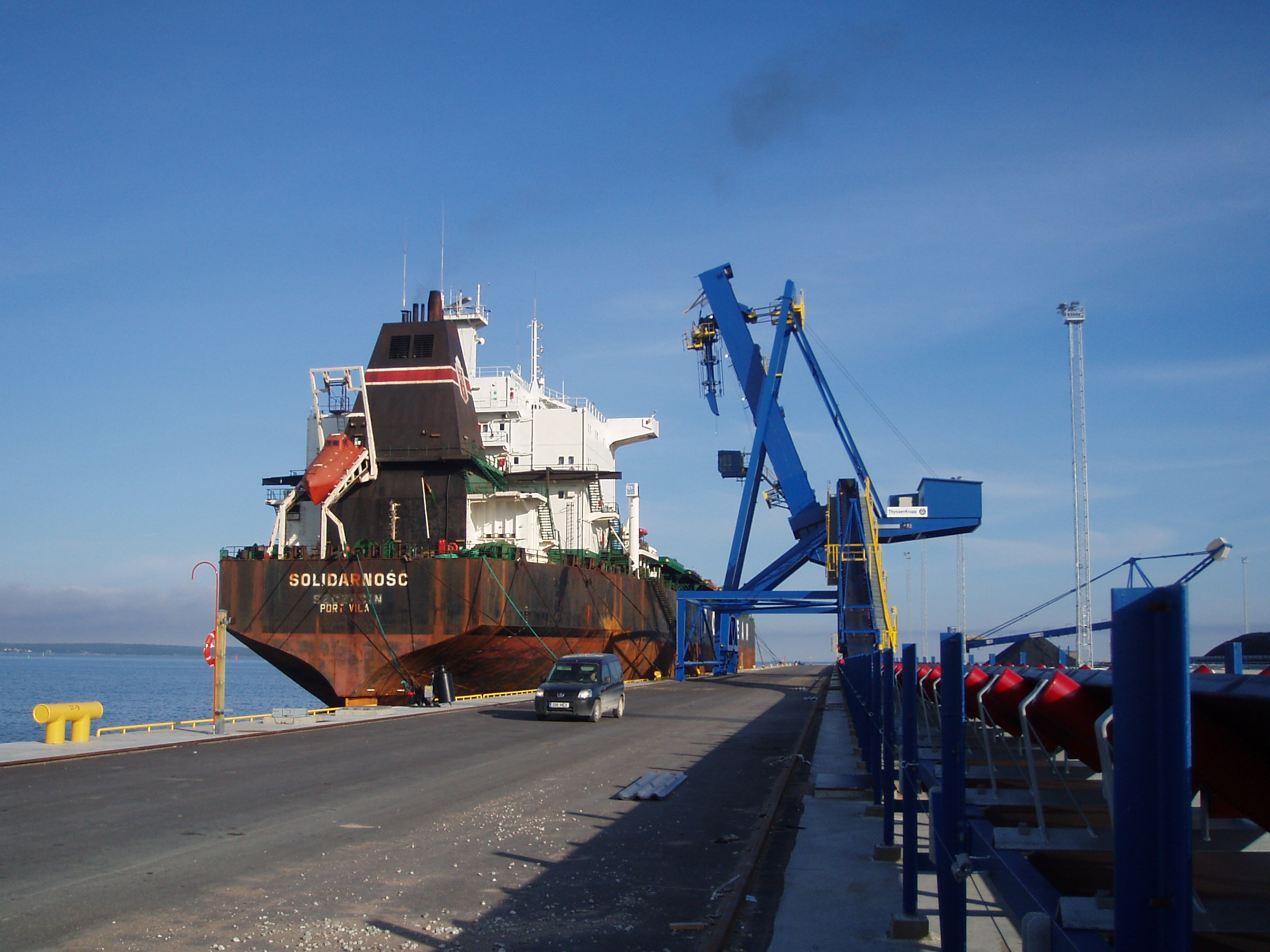
First ship at the Muuga Coal Terminal

== See also ==
- Transport in Estonia
