= Gösta Hallberg-Cuula =

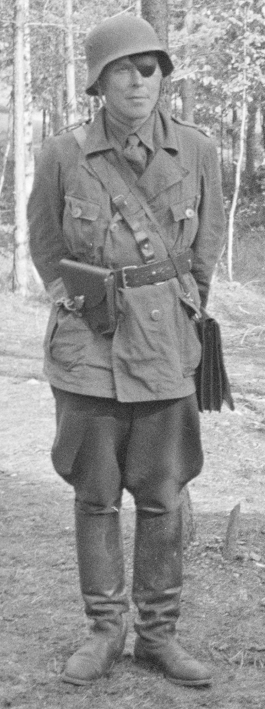
Cuula in Finnish uniform in 1942.

Gösta Hallberg-Cuula, born Gustaf Eugén Hallberg-Cuula (4 November 1912 in Stockholm, - 14 April 1942 at Jantamajoki), was a Swedish-Finnish Nazi, soldier and politician.

== Biography ==
Cuula was the head of propaganda during the 1930s and had membership number 240 in the Swedish National Socialist Workers' Party led by Sven Olov Lindholm. When Finland was invaded by Soviet Union in 1939 in the Winter War he volunteered to what he saw as "the brotherland's defense against communism", and obtained as a Finnish citizen the degree of Finnish reserve lieutenant. During the Continuation War he traveled east again and first participated as platoon commander in Swedish Volunteer Battalion at Hanko Peninsula, then in 1942 in the Swedish Volunteer Company at Svir. He also participated in the establishment of Frontmannaföreningen Sveaborg, an association of Swedes in the Waffen SS.

He stepped on a landmine on April 14, 1942, and was buried at Stockholm's Norra begravningsplatsen on May 9. On his tombstone is the inscription "Fell in the East for Sweden". In Satakunta, in Cuula's home region of Finland, a memorial for him has been erected in the war hero section of the graveyard.

Hallberg-Cuula is idolized by Swedish neo-Nazis, who annually visit his grave to lay flowers there.
