= Ingrian Battalion =

World War II military unit of Finland

- Inkerin Pataljoona
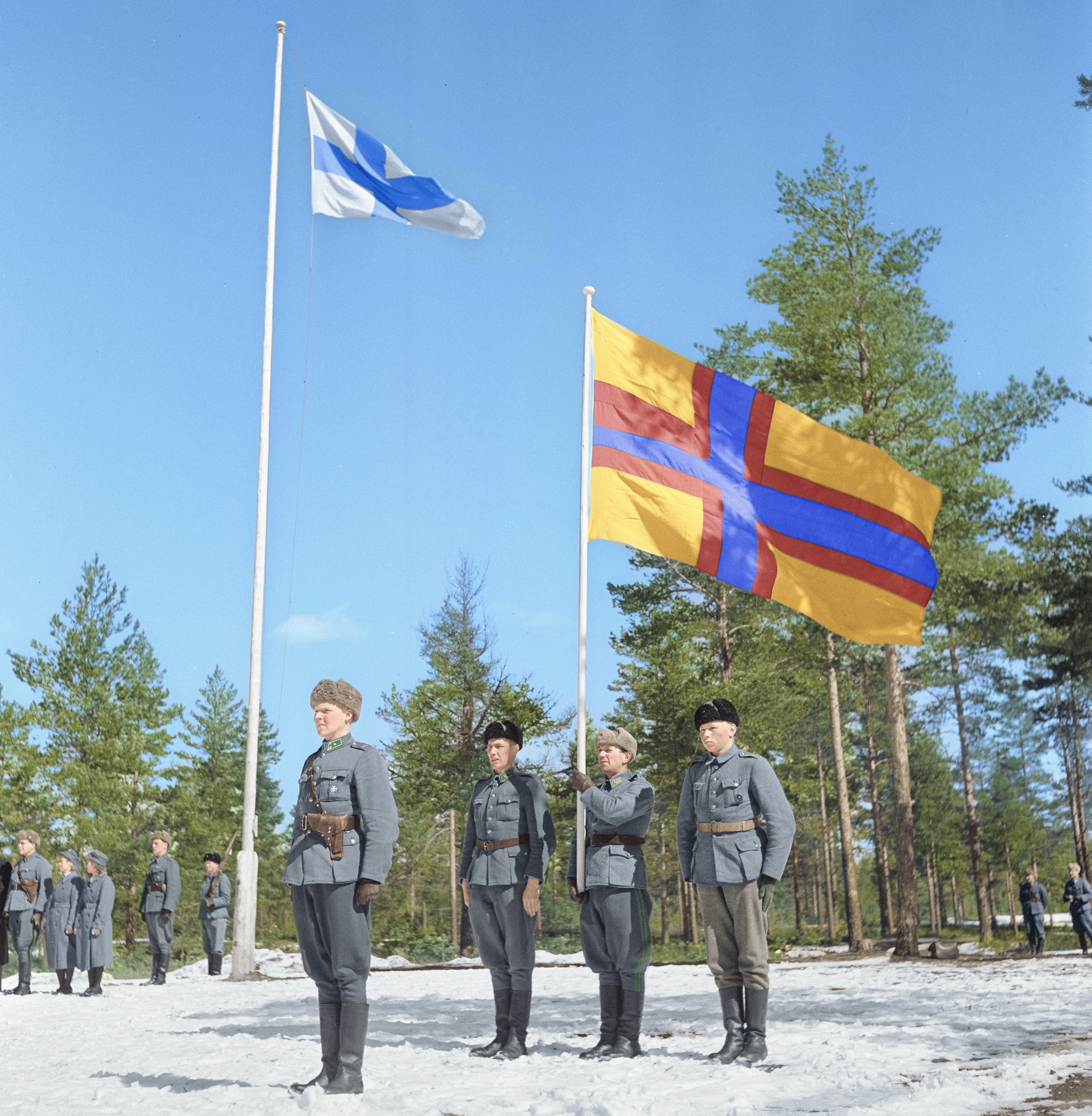
- Men of the Ingrian Battalion (Er.P6) giving their oath to Finland, East Kannas, Leininkylä, 27 April 1944. Colorized by Julius Jääskeläinen
- Active: December 1943 - October 10, 1944
- Country: Estonia; Ingria; Finland
- Allegiance: Finland
- Branch: Finnish Defence Forces
- Size: Battalion
- Engagements: World War II; Continuation War; Lapland War

Commanders
- Everstiluutnantti: Kaarlo Breitholtz
- Majuri: Hans Katas

Insignia
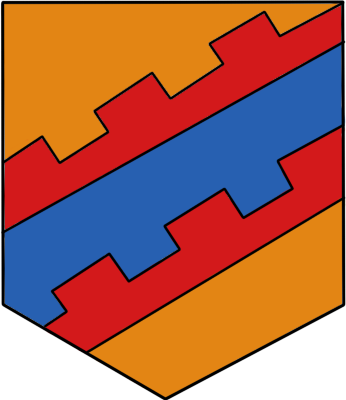
- Identification symbol

The Ingrian Battalion (Finnish: Inkerin Pataljoona), also known as Separate Battalion 6 (Finnish: Erillinen Pataljoona 6/ Er.P6), was military unit of the Finnish Defence Forces which was made up of ethnic Ingrian Finns from Estonia during World War II. The unit was part of the broader Jatkosodan heimosoturit (tribal warriors) unit which consisted of several Finno-Uralic volunteers including Tver, Viennese and Aun Karelians, Ingrian Finns, Vepsians, Komi, Estonians, and Sámi.

== History ==
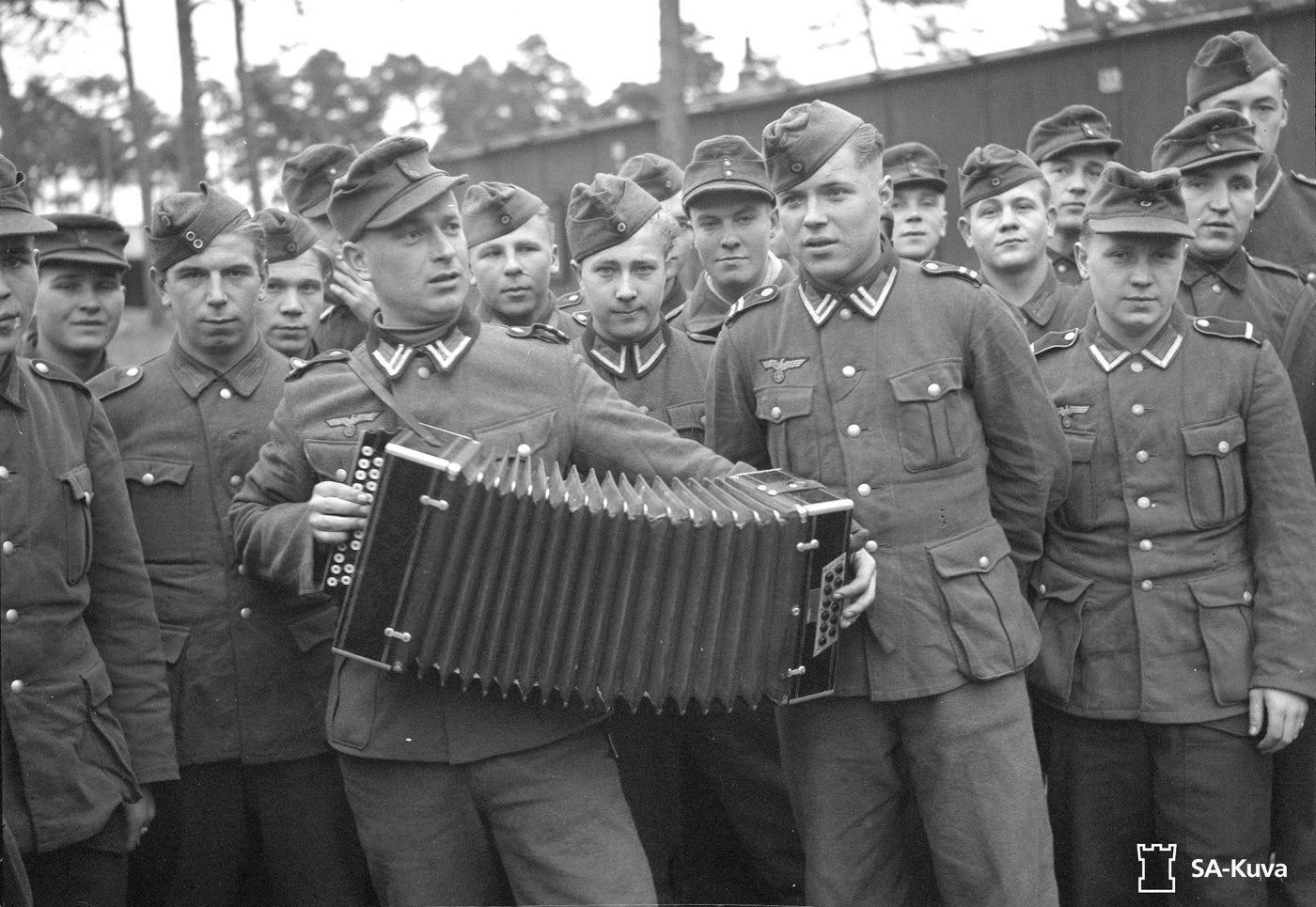
Ingrian Wehrmacht volunteers of the 664th Eastern Battalion in 1943. These Ingrian volunteers were eventually transferred to the Finnish Defence Forces in late 1943

The Ingrian Battalion (Finnish: Inkerin Pataljoona) has its origins in the Wehrmacht unit Finnische Sieheringsgruppe 187 (Finnish Security Group 187), later called Ost-Bataillon 664 (Eastern Battalion 664) when Germany occupied Estonia beginning in July 1941. The battalion was largely made up of Ingrian Finns, as well as other Estonians. Eastern Battalion 664 was known for taking part in the Holocaust, specifically in regard to the massacre of Romani people in Filippovsshina in February 1942. Eastern Battalion 664 existed from February 1942 to December 1943 when it was eventually transferred to the Finnish Defence Forces.

Beginning in March 1943 civilians of the Ingrian Finn population living in Estonia began to be evacuated to Hanko, Finland. During this time Ingrian officers of Eastern Battalion 664 negotiated with the Wehrmacht in order to have their battalion transferred to Finnish command, this change of command was made in Hanko from December 7–13, 1943. In total, some 729 men were transferred to the Finnish Army.

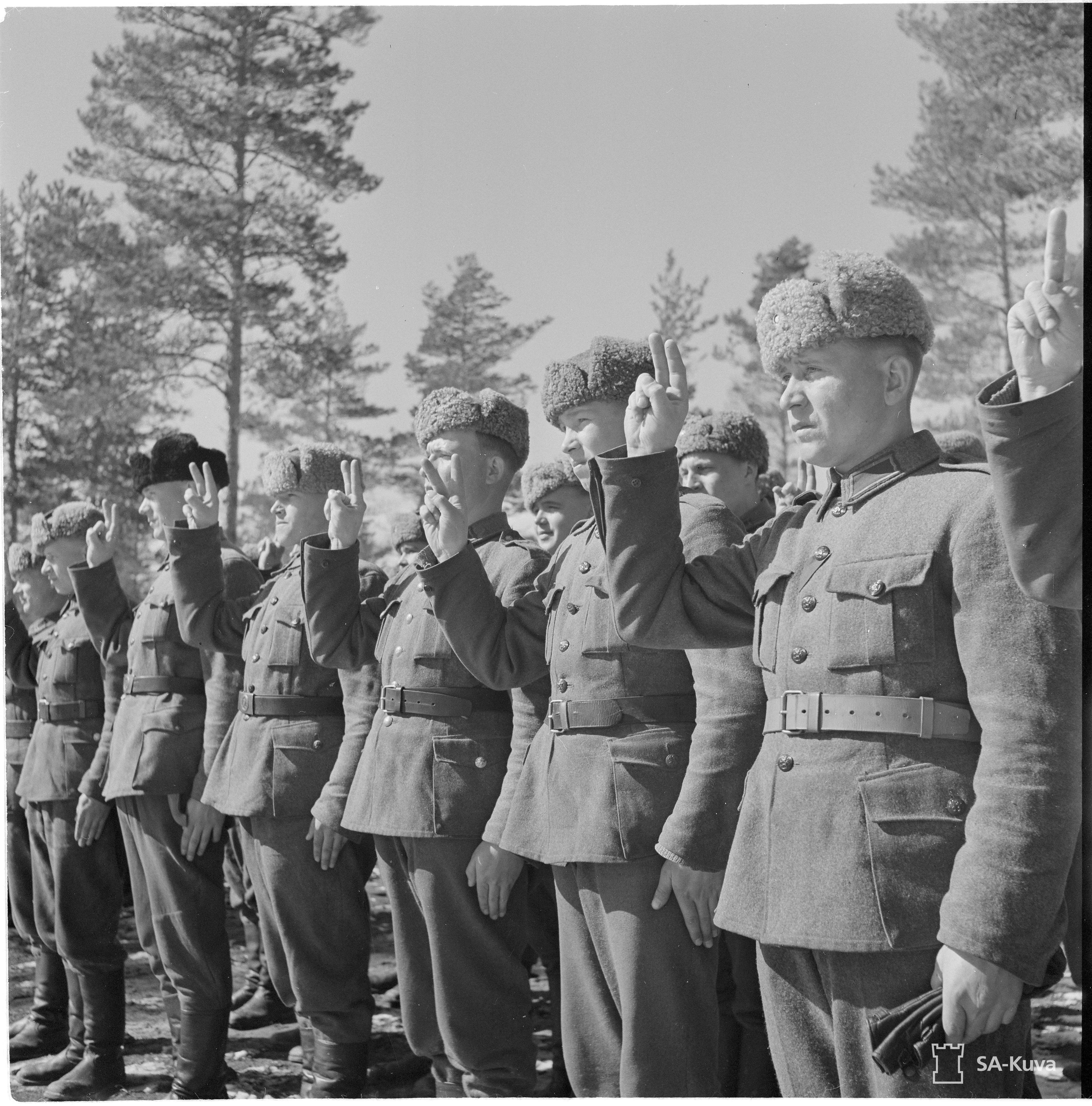
Ingrian Battalion military oath-taking ceremony on April 27, 1944

From 1943 to 1944 the battalion was commanded by Everstiluutnantti (Lieutenant Colonel) Kaarlo Breitholtz. Near the end of the Continuation War and the beginning of the Lapland War the battalion was commanded by Majuri (Major) Hans Katas. During the battalion's military oath the battalion was allowed to carry the ethnic flag of Ingrian Finns alongside the flag of Finland. The Ingrian Battalion served in both the Continuation War and the Lapland War. During the Continuation War the Ingrian Battalion was subordinated to the Finnish 10th Division (10. divisioona) in 1943, the 15th Division (15. divisioona) in 1944, the 19th Brigade (19. prikaati) in May 1944, and lastly the 2nd Division 2. divisioona. During the Vyborg–Petrozavodsk offensive the battalion is noted for its role in the defense of the VT-line during the Battle of Vuosalmi. When the battalion was disbanded on October 10, 1944, following the Moscow Armistice, its strength was 570 men.

== Units ==
- 1st Company (1.K/ErP6), Commander: Lieutenant Sokka.
- 2nd Company (2.K/ErP6), Commander: Lieutenant Jokinen.
- 3rd Company (3.K/ErP6), Commander: Lieutenant Parola.
- 4th Company (4.K/ErP6), Commander: Lieutenant Tirkkonen.

== Commanders ==
- Everstiluutnantti (Lieutenant Colonel) Kaarlo Breitholtz: November 23, 1943 – June 24, 1944.
- Majuri (Major) Hans Katas: June 25, 1944 – October 10, 1944.

== See also ==
- Foreign support of Finland in the Winter War
- Swedish intervention in the Winter War
- Swedish Volunteer Corps
- Swedish Volunteer Battalion
- Swedish Volunteer Company
- Finnish Infantry Regiment 200
