= Sweden and the Winter War =

Actions in the 1939–40 Soviet invasion of Finland

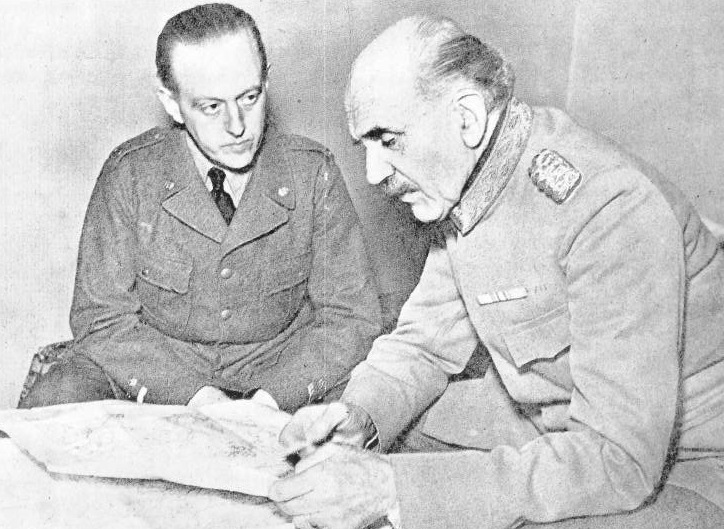
The Commander of Swedish volunteers General Ernst Linder and his Chief of Staff Carl August Ehrensvärd in Tornio during the Winter War.

The Winter War was fought in the four months following the Soviet Union's invasion of Finland on 30 November 1939. This took place three months after the German invasion of Poland that triggered the start of World War II in Europe. Sweden did not become actively involved in the conflict, but did indirectly support Finland. The Swedish Volunteer Corps provided 9,640 officers and men. The Swedish Voluntary Air Force also provided 25 aircraft that destroyed twelve Soviet aircraft while only losing six planes with only two to actual enemy action and four to accidents. Sweden also provided a portion of the weapons and equipment used by the Finns throughout the war.

== Background to Swedish policy ==
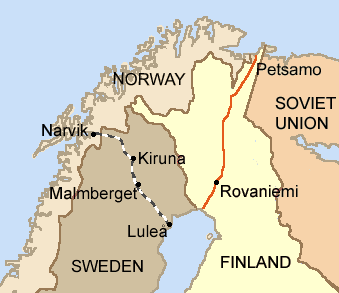
Franco-British support was offered on the condition it was given free passage through non-belligerent Sweden instead of taking the road from the Soviet-occupied Petsamo.

According to the dominant view in Sweden's foreign ministry, Finland's foreign policy had, since its independence and 1918 civil war, been "unsteady and adventurous". In addition, Finland's domestic politics were viewed with great suspicion by Swedish Social Democrats. After the Socialists' defeat in the civil war, anti-parliamentarism and anti-socialist policies dominated Swedish impressions of Finland. Cooperation with Finland had in the 1920s and 1930s primarily been advocated by fringe right-wing politicians and military officers. Both to the right and to the left, a closer cooperation with Finland was seen as a means to counter the hegemonic position of the Social Democrats in Sweden.

After the Abyssinia Crisis, both Finland and Sweden were forced to adjust their foreign policies, as the League of Nations seemed to offer only a hollow protection against foreign aggression. In the Baltic region both the reborn Nazi Germany and the Soviet Union were seen as likely aggressors, eager to regain territories lost as a result of World War I, and likely to want to expand their influence further, if possible. Finland re-oriented its foreign policy towards Scandinavia and a neutralist policy of the Swedish type. The detailed plans for military cooperation were supplemented by intensified contacts between diplomats and politicians. Social Democrats under Väinö Tanner were rehabilitated and included in the cabinet. Finland's embassy in Stockholm was deemed the most important, and Juho Kusti Paasikivi became ambassador there.

Even though central politicians and officials had been converted and convinced of the necessity for a closer Swedish–Finnish cooperation, parliamentarians and prominent individuals did not change their anti-Swedish or anti-Finnish attitudes as easily. Impressions made (in both countries) in connection with Finland's independence, civil war, the Åland crisis, language strife, and the Lapua Movement all stuck. These impressions, in turn, were compounded by a tendency in Sweden to emphasize the danger of Nazi expansionism and to view the Soviet Union with a great deal of goodwill: in Finland, however, the converse view was dominant.

The Nordic trend did not officially allow Swedish participation in security management of the Gulf of Finland with Finland. However, behind the scene, the general staff of Sweden and Finland had negotiated secretly the Gulf of Finland blockade plan in 1929. Sweden agreed that it would first suggest the Gulf blockade to the Estonians in 1930. Officially Sweden would not participate, but it would give materiel and auxiliary troops if the Soviet Union attacked.

Litvinov's demise as Soviet Foreign Minister in March 1939 signaled an increasing tension and danger for Finland and the Baltic countries, and indirectly for Sweden. Litvinov was known as being friendly towards the West, whereas the new minister, Molotov, had made a more aggressive impression. Litvinov's half-promises to accept and support joint Finnish–Swedish provisions for the defense of Åland against the potential German threat were not upheld by his successor. As a consequence, Soviet-leaning ministers in Sweden, such as Ernst Wigforss and Östen Undén, proposed Sweden's withdrawal from these plans. Parliament agreed, being eager to continue Sweden's successful policy, since 1812, of non-confrontation towards Russia.

== The political response to the Soviet invasion ==
In the face of the Molotov–Ribbentrop Pact and the following Soviet aggressions against Poland and the Baltic countries, Finland's situation seemed increasingly dangerous. On 4 October Finland's government asked if Sweden was prepared to contribute to Åland's defense with military means. The following day, Molotov invited a Finnish delegation to Moscow, with Sweden's parliament being informed the day after. On 12 October it turned out that the political support was deemed insufficient in Sweden for a military engagement on Åland: the Rightist Party was in favor, the Social Democrats were split, and a majority of the Farmers party (Bondeförbundet) and all the Liberals were opposed. The opposition to Swedish military assistance on Åland was strengthened by the fear that intervention would become extended to Mainland Finland, which few parliamentarians would support.

Publicly, Finland was supported, but Finland's Foreign Minister Elias Erkko was informed that Swedish troops were not to be expected. It remains controversial to this day whether he delivered this message to his colleagues and his president.

The message perceived by public opinion in Finland, as well as in Sweden, thus differed greatly from the Swedish government's intentions. For two months Finland literally fought for her national survival, but by the end of January 1940, the Soviet Union gave up its plans for a reconquest of the whole of Finland. It was now deemed sufficient if Finland ceded its industrial heartland, including its second largest city Viipuri (Viborg, currently Vyborg). This would mean that the Soviet Union might gain much greater territory than the Red Army had been able to seize control of by military means. Through the so-called Statsrådsdiktamen, Sweden's king helped the public perception of Sweden's intentions converge with the government's intentions.

=== Message from the King ===
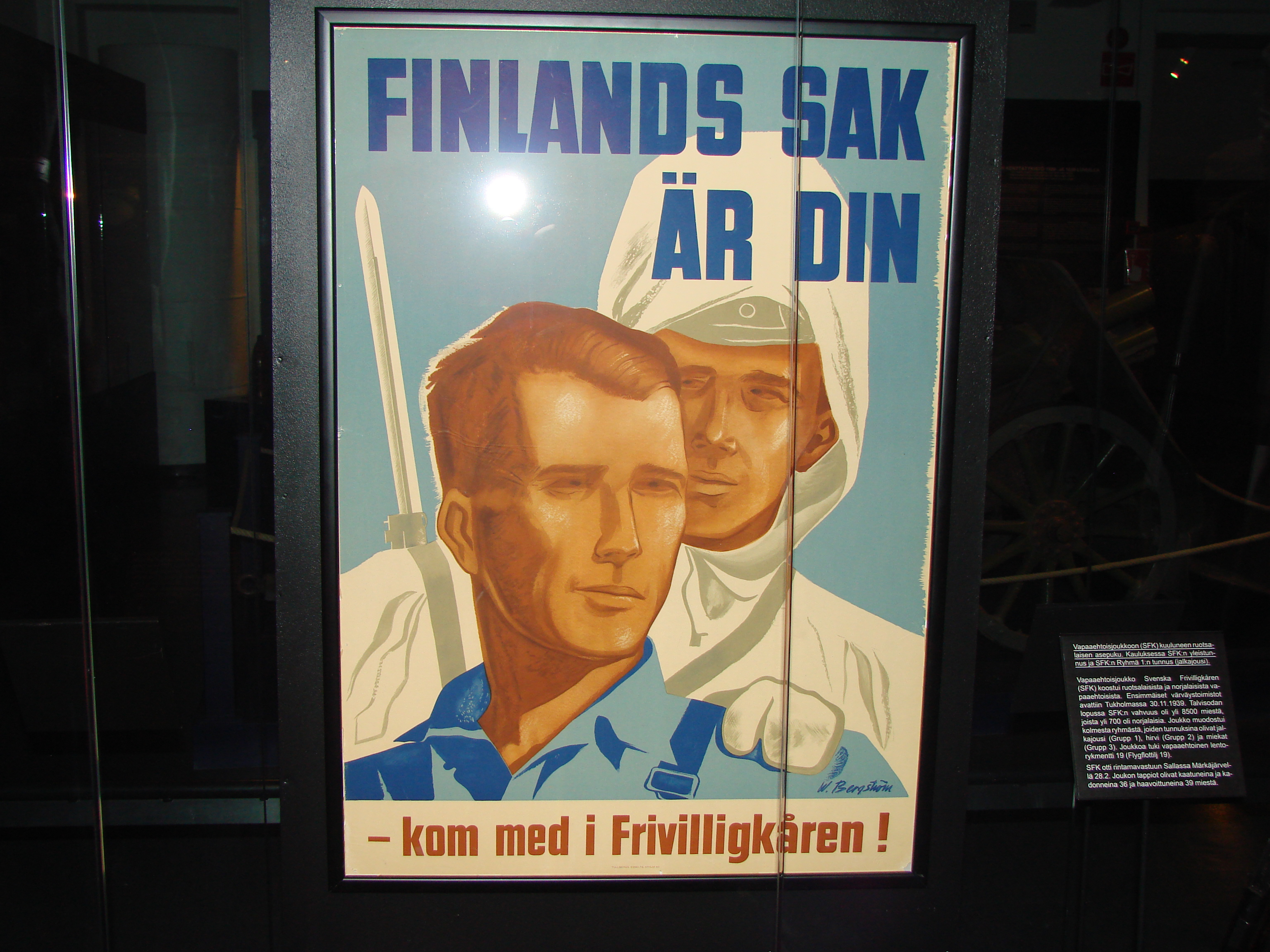
Swedish Volunteer Corps recruitment poster. Translated "Finland's cause is yours".

In the "Statsrådsdiktamen" on 19 February 1940, Sweden's king Gustaf V publicly rejected pleas from Finland's government for military intervention in the Winter War to help defend Finland against the Soviet invasion. This statement from the king was aimed at pressuring Finland to accept harsh Soviet peace conditions and to quiet a strong Swedish activist public opinion advocating participation in the war. The statement had this effect, but was also to produce substantial bitterness in Finland.

During the war, Sweden's government rejected a total of three formal pleas from Finland's government to engage militarily in Finland's defense against the Soviet Union. Detailed plans for Swedish deployment along Finland's border had been made ten years before, and they were regularly updated in secret contacts between the General Staffs of the two countries. However, no formal alliance had been concluded, and a proposed official recognition of cooperative defense of the de-militarized Åland had been rebuffed by Sweden's parliament in June 1939.

== Swedish military's position ==
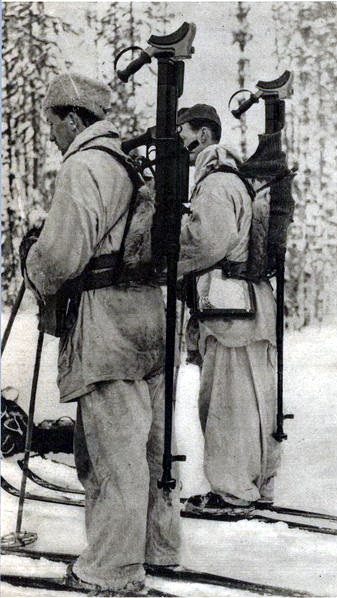
Swedish volunteers during the Winter War.

One of the main considerations that led the Swedish government to declare Sweden a non-belligerent state was concern that they might otherwise lose control of the internal situation in Sweden. The Soviet demands on Finland in the months prior to the outbreak of war had roused public opinion. While there had been large demonstrations in support of Finland, Russia was a traditional enemy, and fear of the Russians had been a part of the Swedish mindset since 1719, when Russian galleys burned Swedish coastal communities during the Great Northern War. Therefore, there was a strong feeling that it was better to defend Sweden on Finnish soil.

Swedish military strength was at one of its low points due to the grand disarmament of 1925. The rearmament program decided in 1936 had not yet had any substantial effect on the armed forces. The army had only 16 tanks apart from a small number of tankettes armed with machine guns. Air defence guns were few and the air force had only 36 Gloster Gladiator fighters. Modern artillery was very limited, short range guns of the Great War era or older were the norm. Worse was that no modern military material was available for purchase, as the producing countries regarded exports secondary to equipping their own armed forces.

Even worse, training had been very reduced in a 1925 decision to cut back on the armed forces, and most units had no winter training and had to leave army units needing to conduct rehearsal training after a mobilization.

Within the Swedish military, officers who had been volunteers in the Finnish Civil War were now senior officers, most notably Axel Rappe, a member of the General Staff, and Archibald Douglas, commander of the Northern Army Corps.

The belief that Sweden was best served by a defence in Finland was enacted primarily by Douglas, whose Northern Army Corps comprised around 26,600 men who had been mobilised to guard the Swedish border with Finland in case the Russians invaded. He reasoned that the best way he could defend Sweden was to move into Finland and meet the Russians there. When the Russians had reached a certain point inside Finland, the whole Northern Army Corps would move across the border and take up positions along the Kemi river, all without approval of the Swedish government.

The fact that the Swedish government did not get news of Douglas' plan right away makes it entirely possible that the plan could have been implemented. However, when they found out the plan was scrapped although Douglas was allowed to retain command and later rose to become Chief of the Army.

The Northern Army Corps, barred from entering Finland, did not end attempts at aid, however. Swedish first line units would sometimes lose equipment and material that was needed on the other side of the border. The willingness to help out can be traced to officers in charge of Swedish supply units likening the Swedish Army Stores at Boden as a Finnish supply base.

It is known that at least 15,000 Swedes volunteered to fight alongside the Finns, with 10,000 accepted for training and 8,000 actually went to Finland in organised units before the war ended, which can be compared to the largest contributor to the International brigades, France, during the entire Spanish Civil War. In addition, a smaller number of individuals joined the Finnish army units or operated mechanical shops repairing equipment, mainly in the Swedish speaking south of Finland. The Swedish government and public also sent food, clothing, medicine, weapons and ammunition to aid the Finns during this conflict. The military aid included:

- 135,402 rifles, 347 machine guns, 450 light machine guns with 50,013,300 rounds of small arms ammunition;
- 144 field guns, 100 anti-aircraft guns and 92 anti-armour guns with 301,846 shells;
- 300 sea mines and 500 depth charges;
- 17 fighter aircraft, 5 light bombers, 1 DC-2 transport aircraft turned into bomber, and 3 reconnaissance aircraft, totally comprising 1/3 of the Swedish air force at the time.

== Aftermath ==
According to Krister Wahlbäck, the Finnish government retrospectively complained about Sweden's passivity: any help had not only been insufficient, but also for the most part come from the military industry's own initiative.

Several books written about the Winter War include reference to the Swedish volunteers and many older Finns today still acknowledge their contributions.

The Winter War helped reaffirm the Swedish position. Aid to Finland had been as much about aiding a neighbour as about neutralising the public opinion calling for active intervention in the war. It also helped to establish the political priorities before the events of 9 April 1940, when Germany invaded Denmark and Norway. The goal was now fixed on keeping Sweden out of the growing European conflict; if they had not gone to war to defend Finland, there was no way that they would do it for Norway.

One of the last surviving Swedish veterans of the war, Bengt Essén, died in August 2020.

== See also ==
- Swedish intervention in the Winter War
- Swedish Volunteer Corps (Winter War)
- Foreign support in the Winter War
- Finnish–Estonian defence cooperation
- Samfundet Nordens Frihet
