= Iosif Stalin-class passenger ship =

Class of Soviet passenger ships

Coordinates: 59°54′N 25°09′E

Class overview
- Name: Iosif Stalin
- Builders: N.V. Nederlandsche Dok & Scheepsbouw Maats., Amsterdam
- Completed: 2

General characteristics
- Type: passenger ship
- Displacement: 8,945 tons
- Length: 135.60 m (444.9 feet)
- Beam: 18.30 m (60 feet)
- Draught: 6.30 m (20.66 feet)
- Propulsion: 2x Stork steam engines; 12,800 hp
- Speed: 15 knots
- Range: 8,950 nm
- Complement: 161 + 437 passengers
- Notes: Ships in class include: Iosif Stalin; Vyacheslav Molotov later Baltika

The Iosif Stalin-class passenger ship was a two-ship class of large turbo-electric powered passenger ships, operated by the Soviet Baltic Sea Shipping Company (BGMP). The ships were taken over by the Soviet Navy during World War II and used as transport vessels. The class was named after Joseph Stalin.

The two Soviet ships Iosif Stalin and Vyacheslav Molotov (after Vyacheslav Molotov) were constructed in 1939 by the Dutch company N.V. Nederlandsche Dok & Scheepsbouw Maatschappij (NDSM), in Amsterdam. The ships were ready and left Amsterdam on 1 May 1940, only nine days prior to the German invasion of the Netherlands. The ships were intended for the Soviet Far East waters, but due to war, they were taken over by the BGMP.

== Ships of the class ==
=== Iosif Stalin ===
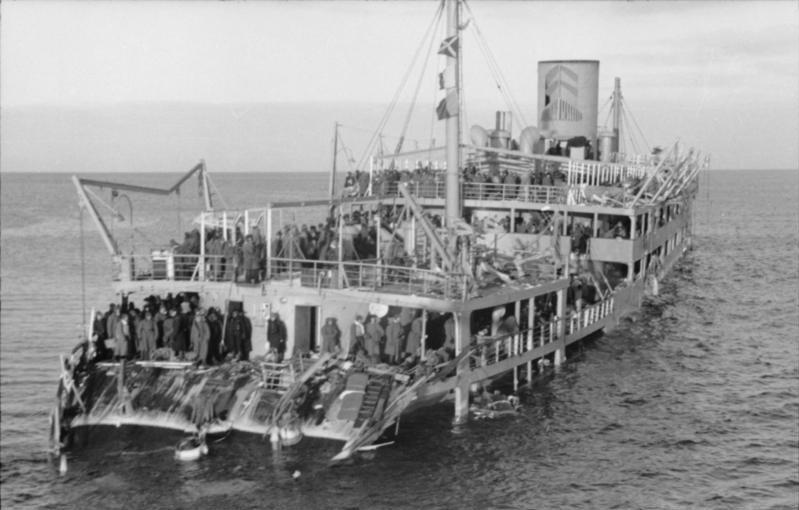
Iosif Stalin sinking, December 1941.

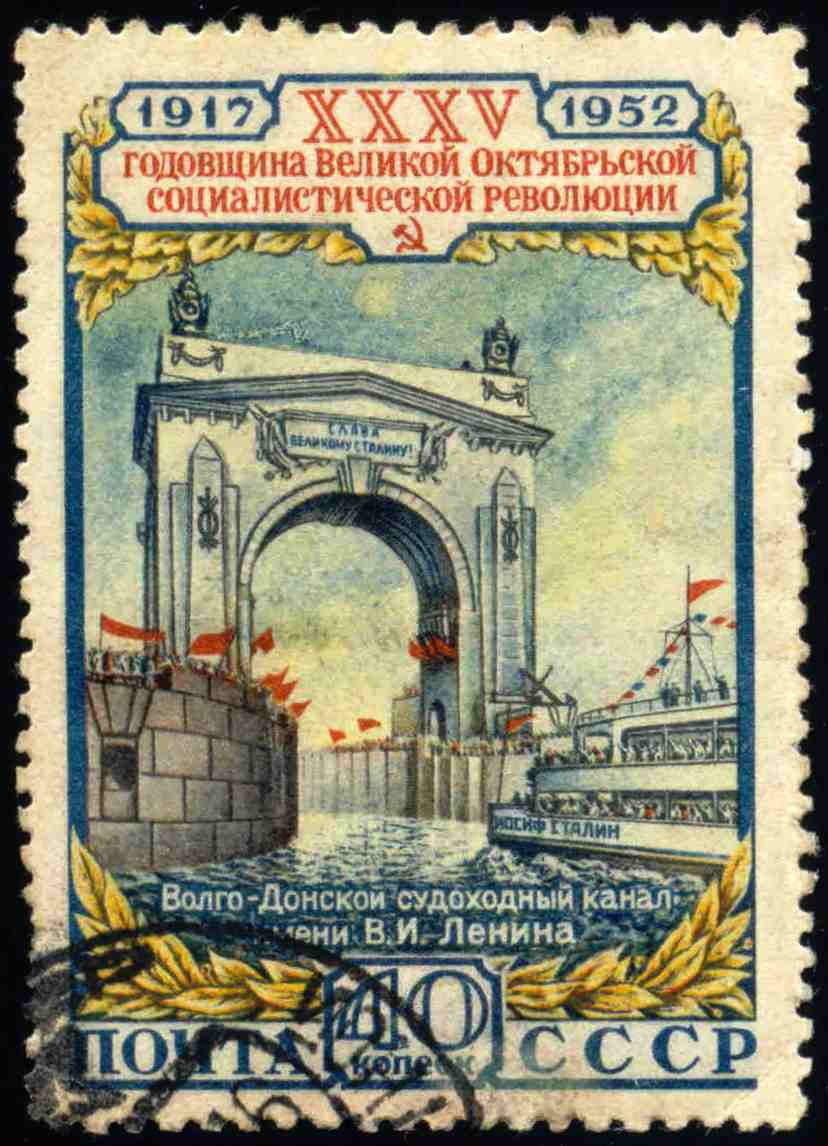
The Iosif Stalin depicted entering the Volga–Don Canal on a 1952 stamp

She was used as a passenger ship before the war and mobilized and renamed VT-521 (Cyrillic: ВТ-521) during World War II. She participated in the evacuations of Tallinn and Hanko in 1941.

The Iosif Stalin was heavily damaged and eventually scuttled in early December when she participated in the Soviet evacuation of the Hanko Peninsula. On 3 December 1941 she departed Hanko with 5,589 men. However she ran into three naval mines, despite being escorted by several minesweepers and being equipped with paravanes. The ship's stern was severely damaged, and her propulsion system was lost, and there were many casualties. While the crew tried to repair the ship, Finnish coastal artillery spotted the convoy and opened fire. Soon the Iosif Stalin took a hit aft from a 12" (305 mm) shell. The shell hit an ammunition magazine, causing a large explosion and the ship began to sink. The dense minefield made it extremely dangerous to try to save the ship. Several Soviet minesweepers were damaged, and one exploded during the rescue operation. Minesweepers No. 205, 211, 215, and 217, and a further 5 patrol boats from the convoy defense managed to rescue 1,740 men. Panic struck the remaining passengers. The convoy continued its journey, and the Iosif Stalin, which had settled deep in the water (water reaching the main deck) drifted towards the Estonian shore and ran aground. A planned Soviet rescue attempt was aborted because one minesweeper ran into a mine and exploded. German forces captured the survivors of the Iosif Stalin.

The ship was "forgotten" in Soviet history, since its commander ordered a capitulation of the nearly 3,000 strong survivors, although they had weapons and ammunition to put up a fairly good defense. The captain of the liner N. S. Stepanov, who left the ship last, was captured and worked in the Port of Tallinn - sawing wood there. Through messengers, he transmitted to the Soviet side data on the movement of German ships and cargo. He was shot by the NKVD in 1944 after the arrival of Soviet troops in Tallinn. The ship was raised on 11 July 1945 and towed to Tallinn, where it was scrapped, though part of the ship's bow remains aground.

=== Vyacheslav Molotov ===
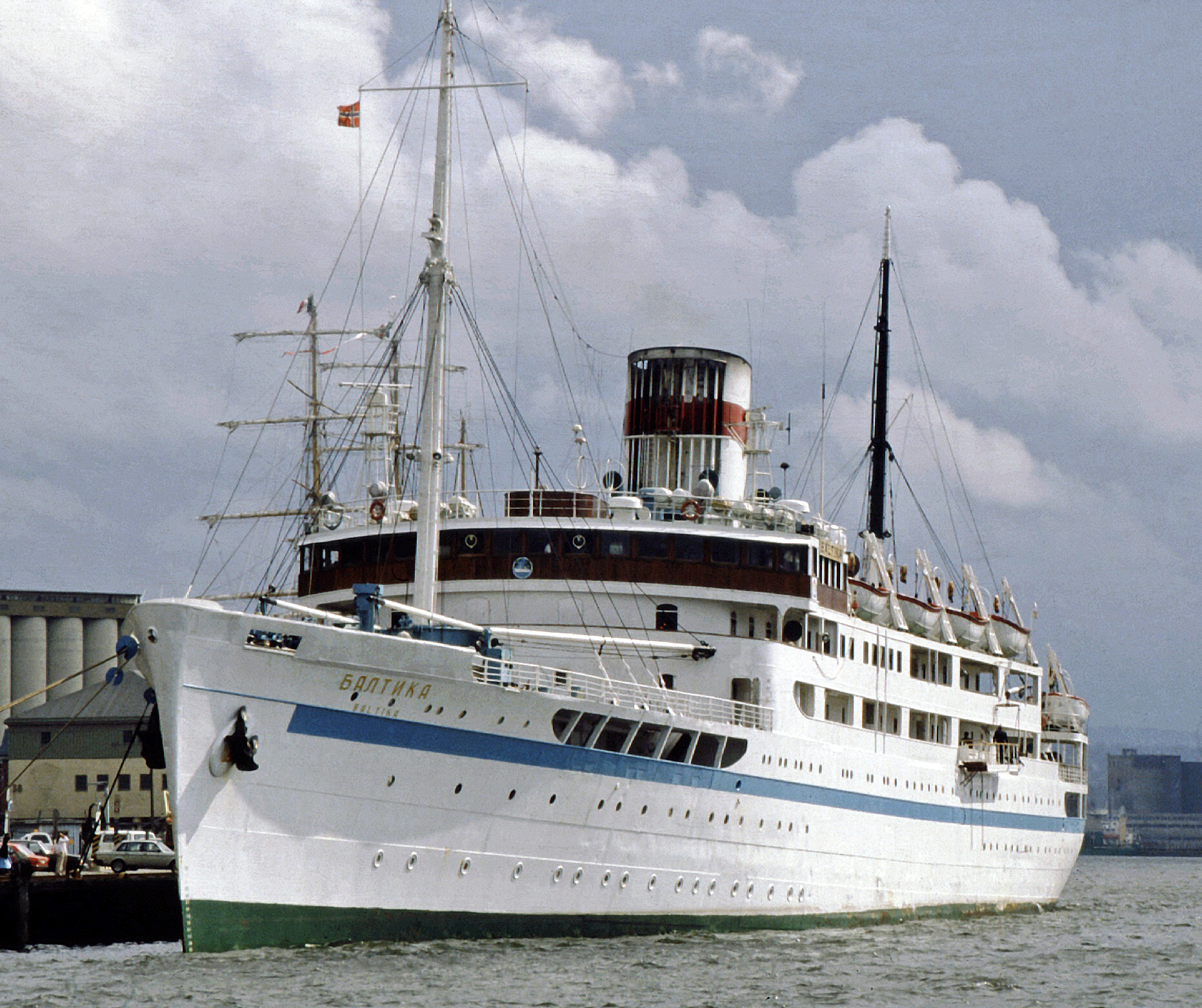
Baltika in Oslo, 1985

Launched on 17 August 1939. Mobilized as the military transport ship VT-509 after the outbreak of the war.

The ship participated in the evacuation from Tallinn in the summer of 1941. She was damaged by a mine (which sunk the minesweeper T-201 Zaryad) and aerial bombing and was towed back to Leningrad to be repaired. The ship was later used as a stationary hospital ship during the blockade of Leningrad. It also found other uses: its radio station transmitted news and it also functioned as an ammunition factory. The Vyacheslav Molotov was damaged by German artillery fire in early 1943.

The Vyacheslav Molotov was repaired and returned as a passenger ship after the second world war. She was later used for the Leningrad-London route and also for trips to many European countries, Cuba and the United States. In 1957 she was renamed Baltika. She was also used to transport many international delegations, including those for the 20th Olympic Games in Munich in 1972. In September 1971, as Baltika, she repatriated many of the 105 Soviet officials, including 45 diplomats, expelled from the United Kingdom for "activities incompatible with their status". She was refitted in 1984 in Denmark, but broken up in 1987.
