= List of foreign volunteers =

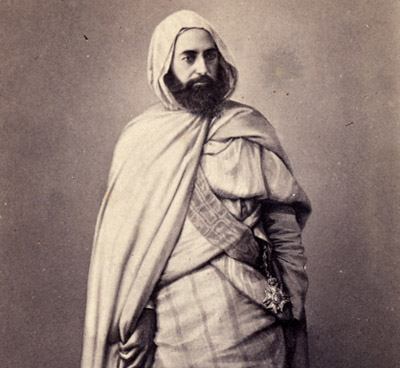
Emir Abdelkader, wearing the sash of the Légion d'honneur presented to him by the French government. The exiled Muslim Algerian, along with his 1,000 volunteers, protected most of the diplomats and thousands of Christians during the 1860 Mount Lebanon civil war. He was awarded the highest decorations by European governments.

The armed forces of many nations have, at one time or another, used foreign volunteers who are motivated by political, ideological or other considerations to join a foreign army. These may be formed into units of a given nationality or may be formed into mixed nationality foreign units. Sometimes foreign volunteers were or are incorporated into ordinary units. The practice has a long history, dating back at least as far as the Roman Empire, which recruited non-citizens into Auxiliary units on the promise of them receiving Roman citizenship for themselves and their descendants at the end of their service.

== Mixed nationality units ==
=== Historic ===
- 60th (Royal American) Regiment of Foot. Composed of 'foreign Protestants'.
- Boer foreign volunteers
- Hohenlohe Regiment of France during the Bourbon Restoration.
- International Brigades of the Spanish Civil War
- The Islamic Legion of Libya under Muammar Qaddafi was composed of Muslim volunteers, primarily from the Sahel.
- Kempeitai Auxiliary units consisted of regional ethnic forces that were organized in areas occupied by the Japanese.
- King's African Rifles
- Papal Zouaves, a predominantly Catholic unit in service of the Papal States, resisting the Unification of Italy
- The SS (particularly the Waffen-SS) made extensive use of foreigners during World War II. For more information, see: Waffen-SS foreign volunteers and conscripts
- Rhodesian Light Infantry (initially all-Rhodesian, this unit became the "Foreign Legion" of the Rhodesian Army)
- Mahal – non-Israeli volunteers who fought for Israel in the 1948 Arab–Israeli War. There is to this day a voluntary program called Mahal in the Israeli army.
- Afghan mujahideen - many foreign Muslim volunteers joined the Afghan side of the Soviet invasion of Afghanistan. A few notable examples include Osama bin Laden (of Saudi Arabia), Abdullah Yusuf Azzam (Palestinian), Koshiro Tanaka (Japanese), and Ilyas Kashmiri (from Pakistani-administered Kashmir). The Maktab al-Khidamat was an international organisation founded by bin Laden and Azzam mobilise international support during the Afghan war, including by recruiting and training foreign mujahideen.
- Bosnian mujahideen were foreign Muslim volunteers who fought on the Bosniak side during the Bosnian War.

=== Current ===
==== Also including nationals ====
- The Interbrigades of the Russo-Ukrainian War.
- Tercio de Extranjeros, or Tercio, or Spanish Legion - prior to 1987 and in the 2000s, after the abandonment of conscription, the Spanish Army is again accepting foreigners from select nationalities. The Legion today accepts male and female native Spanish speakers, mostly from Central American and South American states. Recruits are required to have a valid Spanish residence permit.
- Mujahideen
  - Mujahideen in Chechnya - many foreign Muslim volunteers have also participated in the conflicts in the North Caucasus. See also: Islamic International Peacekeeping Brigade

==== Only including foreigners ====
- French Foreign Legion - Officer corps, predominantly French.
- International Freedom Battalion – An armed group of leftist foreign volunteers that fight in support of the Rojava Revolution in Syria.
- International Legion for the Defence of Ukraine – military unit formed to help defend the country from the 2022 Russian invasion.
  - International Legion of the Defence Intelligence of Ukraine – special forces unit formed by the best foreign volunteers under command of the Main Directorate of Intelligence.
- Anti-Fascist Internationalist Front – An armed group of leftist foreign volunteers that fight in support of the People's Defensive War in Myanmar.

== Units by nationality ==
=== American ===
During both world wars, American volunteers served on the allied side before the US joined the war. During World War I, there were even a few Americans who volunteered to fly for the Imperial German Flying Corps.

- The Lafayette Escadrille in the French Air Force, World War I
- A number of American pilots flew with No. 32 Squadron RAF during World War I
- The 7th Air Escadrille (also known as the Kościuszko Squadron) in the Polish Air Force, Polish-Soviet War
- The Lincoln Brigade on the Republican side of the Spanish Civil War
- The Eagle Squadrons in the Royal Air Force, World War II
- The Flying Tigers in the Republic of China Air Force, World War II
- Before the US entered the war, many Americans joined the Canadian Forces, especially the RCAF, and served in ordinary Canadian units.
- The Five Yanks – Rachel Cox in Into the Dust and Fire records the history of five Ivy Leaguers (Chuck Bolte, Jack Brister, Bill Durkee, Heyward Cutting, and Robert Cox) who enlisted in the British Army and became the first Americans to fight the Nazis
- The Crippled Eagles – American volunteers in Rhodesia (1965–1979)

=== Albanian ===
- The 21st Waffen Mountain Division of the SS Skanderbeg was a division of the German Waffen-SS that was developed around a nucleus of Albanian volunteers, named after Albanian medieval lord George Kastrioti Skanderbeg. It was better known for murdering, raping, and looting in predominantly Serb areas than for participating in combat operations on behalf of the German war effort.

=== Bangladeshi ===
- 8000 young men from Bangladesh volunteered to enlist in the PLO in 1987

=== Belgian ===
- Units from modern-day Belgium (then the Austrian Netherlands or United Kingdom of the Netherlands) served in the French armies of both the French Revolutionary and Napoleonic Wars
- During the Liberal Wars, a corps of Belgian volunteers fought for the Liberal side.
- The Belgian Legion during the Franco-Mexican War of 1864–1866
- The 6 Février Battalion, part of the International Brigades during the Spanish Civil War was made up of French and Belgians. Their citizenship rights were revoked as a result of their decision to serve in a foreign army.
- Two Belgian units fought in the Waffen SS during the Second World War.

=== British ===
- During the Peninsular War, many Britons joined Spanish regular and irregular forces.
- The state-sponsored Auxiliary Legion of the First Carlist War.
- The British Legions in the South American Wars of Independence during the 19th century.
- The British Free Corps of the Waffen SS in World War II.
- 2,500 British fought in the Spanish Civil War on the side of the republicans.
- In the Paraguay Revolution of 1922, British pilots fought in the Escuela de Aviación Militar.
- Many Britons fought during the American Civil War for both the United States and Confederate States. 67 British soldiers in the Union Army received the Medal of Honor.
- Dozens of British volunteers joined Croatian units and fought in the Yugoslav Wars between 1991 and 1995, most of them on the King Tomislav Brigade.
- Hundreds of British Nationals served in the Rhodesian Security Forces during the Rhodesian Bush War in the 1970s.
- A couple of dozen British volunteers joining several units of the Ukrainian military, particularly of the Ukrainian Foreign Legion, and the Azov Assault Brigade

=== Bulgarian ===
- Bulgarian Volunteer Corps. Fought for the Russian Empire during the Russo-Turkish War of 1877-1878.

=== Bosnian ===
- Bosnia and Herzegovina has seen some 300 people join the conflict in Syria and Iraq, making it one of the top per capita exporters of foreign fighters in Europe.
- The Bosnian War attracted large numbers of foreign fighters and mercenaries from various countries. Volunteers came to fight for a variety of reasons including religious or ethnic loyalties, but mostly for money.
- The 13th Waffen Mountain Division of the SS Handschar, composed mainly of Bosnian Muslims with some Catholic Croats, and mostly German officers
- The 23rd Waffen Mountain Division of the SS Kama, composed of German officers and Bosnian Muslim soldiers fought in World War II on the Axis' side

=== Canadian ===
- The 1st Canadian Regiment was a regiment of the Continental Army which fought during the American Revolutionary War.
- The 2nd Canadian Regiment was another regiment of the Continental Army which fought during the American Revolutionary War.
- During the American Civil War, between 33,000 and 55,000 men joined the Union Army with around another a few hundred joining the Confederate Army.
- Between February 1868 and September 1870 during the Risorgimento, 7 contingents of Canadian volunteers totaling 507 (most of whom were from Quebec) enrolled in the Papal army as part of the Canadian Battalion of Papal Zouaves.
- The Mackenzie-Papineau Battalion (Mac-Paps) consisted of 1,500 Canadian volunteers who fought on the Republican side of the Spanish Civil War as part of the International Brigades. Often composed of working class Canadians and immigrants, the Mac-Paps were noted for being different from their comrades in the US Lincoln Brigade (often students and intellectuals).
- The Ilkka Machine Gun Company was a company sized unit that was attached to the Mackenzie-Papineau Battalion. It was composed of Finnish Canadians.
- 250 Canadians served in the Finnish American Legion during the Winter War.
- During the Vietnam War, between 20,000 and 40,000 Canadians volunteered in the United States Armed Forces to fight in Vietnam.
- The Canadian-Ukrainian Brigade is a unit of the Armed Forces of Ukraine that mainly consists of ex-Canadian servicemen.

=== Chinese ===
- The Chinese People's Volunteer Army that fought in the Korean War was nominally composed of volunteers sent by the People's Republic of China even though it was in fact composed of regular troops of the People's Liberation Army.

=== Croatian ===
- 20 to 30 Croatians fought as part of the far-right Azov volunteer battalion against Russian-backed rebels in eastern Ukraine since 2014
- A total of 456 international volunteers from as many as 35 countries participated in the Croatian War of Independence (139 English, 69 French, 55 Germans, 33 Hungarians, 27 Dutch, 15 Australians)
- The 369th (Croatian) Reinforced Infantry Regiment as part of the German Wehrmacht, fought in World War II
- The 369th (Croatian) Infantry Division, as part of German Wehrmacht, fought in World War II
- The 373rd (Croatian) Infantry Division, as part of German Wehrmacht, fought in World War II
- The 392nd (Croatian) Infantry Division, as part of German Wehrmacht, fought in World War II
- The Croatian Air Force Legion, as part of the German Luftwaffe fought in World War II on the Axis' side
- The Croatian Anti-Aircraft Legion, as part of the German Luftwaffe fought in World War II on the Axis' side
- The Croatian Naval Legion, as part of the German the Kriegsmarine, fought in World War II on the Black Sea
- The Italian-Croatian Legion, unit of about 1,000 Croatian volunteers fighting for the Royal Italian Army
- Four Croatian Provisional Infantry Regiments of the French Imperial Army fought in the Napoleonic Wars.
- The Royal Cravat Cavalry Regiment of the French Royal Army founded in 1667 and disbanded in 1815

=== Czech ===
- The Czechoslovak Legion, which fought on various fronts of WW1, as well as the Russian Civil War.
- 1st Czechoslovak Army Corps in the Soviet Union.

=== Danish ===
- Danish-Baltic Auxiliary Corps, formed to defend Estonia against the Bolsheviks during the Russian Civil War.

=== Estonian ===
- In 1944, some 2,000 Estonians served in the Finnish Infantry Regiment 200 during the Continuation War.

=== Filipino ===
- The Spanish colonial army in the Philippines launched an expedition to Cambodia, which included Japanese mercenaries.
- Two hundred fifty French mercenaries served with British forces that invaded Manila in 1762. They changed sides and fought for the Spanish.
- In the 1770s, the Spanish colonial army in the Philippines had an Infantry Company of Cavite Malabars
- Filipinos served in the French military during the Cochinchina Campaign.
- Filipinos served in the Ever Victorious Army.
- The Philippine Revolutionary Army included commissioned officers who were American, Chinese, Cuban, English, Italian, Japanese, and Spanish.
- The Philippine Constabulary in its early years had commissioned officers from Belgium, Cuba, England, France, Germany, Ireland, Italy, the Philippines, Poland, Puerto Rico, Scotland, Spain, Sweden, and Turkey.
- Twenty-four Filipinos served in the French Army during World War I.
- Some Americans served in the Philippine National Guard.
- Filipinos fought on both sides of the Spanish Civil War.
- During the Pacific War, Filipinos served in various pro-Japanese militias:
  - The Bisigbakal ñg Tagala (Tagalog "Iron Arm of Tagala") was formed in January 1945 to assist the Japanese in maintaining peace and order in Manila. The Bisig Bakal received weapons, uniforms, and training from the Japanese.
  - About five thousand Filipinos served in a militia called the Makapili, which was under Japanese command. The unit was formed on 10 November 1944 and was issued around two thousand rifles by the Japanese. Its headquarters was located at the Christ the King compound in Quezon City. The organization was active in the Manila area, and in the nearby provinces of Rizal, Laguna, Bulacan, and Nueva Ecija. This militia made its last stand at Marikina in 1945. Other militias similar to the Makapili were: the Borong-Borong Gang, Kaigun Hatai, and Nishimura Butai.
  - The Pambansang Pag-asa ng mga Anak ni Rizal (Tagalog "National Hope of the Children of Rizal") consisted of Ganáps in Pililla, Rizal, who were organized into a semi-military unit with the assistance of the Japanese. Also known as Pampar, they wore blue denim uniforms with short pants and were drilled along Japanese military lines. They performed sentry duties for the Japanese, and functioned as auxiliary troops of the Japanese army. They independently conducted raids against guerrilla camps.
  - The Yoin, incorrectly known as U.N. or United Nippon, were members of the Japanese Auxiliary Army drawn from the ranks of the Ganáp Party. They were trained for military purposes and wore Japanese regular uniforms. They were used as replacements in the ranks of Japanese infantry. Their counterparts in the Japanese Empire were the Koreans, Formosans, and Manchuokuans pressed into the Japanese army.
- Some Americans and some Japanese fought with Filipino guerrillas.
- One American joined the Huks.
- Filipinos, recruited by the Moro Islamic Liberation Front, fought in the Soviet–Afghan War. (See Abdurajak Abubakar Janjalani)
- Filipinos hired by private military companies worked in Afghanistan and Iraq.
- Filipinos fought in the Syrian Civil War.
- Forty foreign fighters, from Indonesia, Malaysia, Yemen, and Chechnya, fought in the Siege of Marawi.
- At least seventeen Filipinos fought for Ukraine in the Russia-Ukraine War.

=== Finnish ===
- As part of the Jäger Movement, a Finnish battalion was formed and served under the German Empire against the Russian Empire.
- A brigade of Finnish volunteers called the Pohjan Pojat, took part in the Estonian War of Independence.
- 1,408 Finns volunteered to serve in the 5th SS Panzer Division Wiking, against the USSR.

=== French ===
- Foreign Legion - A wing of the French Army which recruits foreign nationals.
- 9,000 French fought in the International Brigades during the Spanish Civil War in the side of the Republicans. some also fought for the Nationalists
- Some French emigres who fled to Britain fought in the British Army of the Napoleonic Wars.
- Charlemagne Brigade of the Waffen SS fought for Nazi Germany in the Second World War. Preceded by the Legion of French Volunteers Against Bolshevism and then the SS Volunteer Sturmbrigade France, the Charlemagne Brigade was notorious for its brutal bandenbekämpfung tactics on the Eastern Front, terrorising civilians to quell resistance. Being composed largely of French volunteers, the Charlemagne Brigade was also notorious for its loyalty, fighting at the Battle of Berlin and being one of the last Nazi units to surrender.
- Chasseurs Britanniques of the Napoleonic Wars.
- Legion of French Volunteers Against Bolshevism a collaborationist force of French who fought Soviet partisans for Nazi Germany.
- From 1991 to 1994, during the Croatian War of Independence and the Bosnian War, a number of French volunteers fought alongside the Croats in the King Tomislav Brigade.
- 7 Independent Company (Rhodesia).

=== German ===
- Landsknecht
- Hessian (soldier)
- King's German Legion in the Napoleonic Wars.
- During the American Civil War, Germany was the place of birth for thousands of Union soldiers. Several German speaking regiments existed such as the 9th Ohio Infantry, or the 74th Pennsylvania Infantry.
- In the Spanish Civil War, the state-sponsored Condor Legion fought for the Nationalists, while the Thälmann Battalion fought for the Republicans.
- From 1991 to 1994, during the Croatian War of Independence and the Bosnian War, a number of former Bundeswehr and East-German army members fought alongside the Croats in the King Tomislav Brigade. The brigade's executive officer at the time of the outbreak of the Bosnian Croat War was former Bundeswehr officer Jürgen Schmidt, who died while leading his troops against Bosnian Muslim forces near Gornji Vakuf, in January 1993. In another action, a German-volunteer patrol, led by former Bundeswehr member Michael Homeister, ambushed and killed two Serbs manning an observation post.

=== Greek ===
- The Greek Battalion of Balaklava participated in the Russo-Turkish wars of 1768–1774, 1787–1792 and 1806–1812 on the side of the Russian Empire.
- The Greek Volunteer Guard, fought in the Bosnian War on the side of the Army of Republika Srpska.
- The Greek Volunteer Legion, fought in the Crimean War on the side of the Russian Empire.

=== Indian ===
- The Free Indian Legion was a volunteer legion made up of Indian POWs. The legion was first part of the Wehrmacht but transferred to the Waffen-SS late in the war.
- Battaglione Azad Hindoustan.

=== Irish ===
See also Irish military diaspora.

- The Irish Brigade in the French Army from 1690 and through the eighteenth century.
- The Irish Legion fought for Imperial France during the Napoleonic Wars
- 1st Regiment Venezuelan Rifles – Irish regiment that was part of the British Legions fighting in the South American Wars of Independence took part in the Venezuelan War of Independence.
- St. Patrick's Battalion in the Mexican Army during the Mexican–American War.
- The Irish Brigade which served on the Union side in the American Civil War in the 1860s
- Irish commandos in the Boer Army during the Boer War
- Connolly Column, fought for the Spanish republic in the Spanish Civil War.
- The Irish Brigade which fought for the Nationalist rebels in the Spanish Civil War
- Irish Papal Battalion fought for the Papal States prior to Italian Unification.
- Irish Regiment of Canada fought in WW1 and WW2 for Canada along with the Irish Fusillers (Canadian).
- South African Irish Regiment fought for the Union of South Africa both in WW1 and WW2 and was later transformed to a reserve unit which still forms part of the modern Republic of South African Army.

=== Israeli ===
- Mahal – Program for non-Israelis between the age of 18–24 to serve in the IDF.

=== Italian ===
- Condottiero
- The Redshirts of Giuseppe Garibaldi fought in Southern Italy and Uruguay.
- Corpo Truppe Volontarie in the Spanish Civil War.
- Division Garibaldi fought under Josip Broz Tito's command as a part of NOVJ in Dalmatia and Bosnia, during the Second World War

=== Japanese ===
- The Spanish colonial army in the Philippines launched an invasion of Cambodia in the sixteenth century. This force included some Japanese mercenaries.
- In the seventeenth century, Yamada Nagamasa was the commander of the cavalry of the Ayutthaya Kingdom. Some Japanese also served as palace guards.
- Some Japanese served as commissioned officers in the Philippine Revolutionary Army.
- During World War I, some Japanese pilots served with the French flying corps. Additionally there was a ready-formed Japanese Detachment of fifty-three Japanese which joined the French Foreign Legion, in addition to sixty other Japanese also serving in the Legion.
- Kempeitai Auxiliary units included colonial subjects such as Formosans, Indochinese, Koreans, and Malays. Foreigners included Chinese, Filipinos and Manchuokuans.
- Former Japanese soldiers fought alongside anti-colonial guerrillas in the First Indochina War, Indonesian National Revolution, and the Malayan Emergency. They also fought on both sides of the Chinese Civil War.
- Japanese volunteers in the Russian Army

=== Korean ===
- During World War II, some Koreans served in the German Army. (See Yang Kyoungjong)
- The Korean Augmentation to the United States Army is a programme in which South Korean personnel are attached to the United States Eighth Army

=== Moroccan ===
- Fuerzas Regulares Indígenas in the 1934 Asturian uprising and the Spanish Civil War.

=== Nepalese ===
- Gurkhas in the British Army.
- Gorkhas in the Indian Army.
- Gurkha Contingent in the Singapore Police Force
- Gurkha Reserve Unit – a similar type force in Brunei.
- Foreign Legion in the French Army.

=== Polish ===
- Brigades in the Spanish Civil War.
- Polish Lancers and other Polish forces in the Army of Napoleon.
- Polish Volunteers in many wars and revolutions of the 19th century, including the Spring of Nations, Crimean War (on the Turkish side) and The Paris Commune.
- The Blue Army, fought on the western front for the Allies during WW1.
- The Polish Legions, which fought for the Central Powers.
- Two fighter squadrons took part in the Battle of Britain

=== Portuguese ===
- Legião Viriato in the Spanish Civil War.

=== Rhodesian ===
- There were hundreds of foreign volunteers in the Rhodesian Security Forces during the Rhodesian Bush War. The Rhodesian Army accepted foreign volunteers, almost all of whom were required to speak English, as they were integrated into regular units (usually the Rhodesian Light Infantry) alongside locally based soldiers. The exception was 7 Independent Company, a short-lived unit made up entirely of French-speaking personnel, led by francophone officers, which existed between 1977 and 1978.

=== Russian ===
- The Armed Forces of the Russian Federation have since 2010 or so begun to recruit CIS volunteers. See Armed Forces of the Russian Federation#Personnel.
- A number of Russian soldiers would fight for Ukraine during the Russo-Ukrainian War as part of the Freedom of Russia Legion.
- Soviet Volunteer Group, between 1937 and 1941 as part of the Republic of China Air Force during the Second Sino-Japanese War.
- Some Russians fought for the Allies on the Western Front of WW1 as part of the Russian Legion. They were former members of the Russian Expeditionary Force.
- A small group of White Russian emigres fought for Nationalist Spain as part of the Spanish Legion.
- Asano Brigade, a unit of White Russian Emigres in Manchukuo.
- Various Russian collaborators, nicknamed Hiwis fought in both the Wehrmacht and the Waffen SS.
- Russian Emigres served in the Shanghai Volunteer Corps, a multinational volunteer force of the Shanghai International Settlement.
- On the Russian side in the conflict with Ukraine, volunteers from Cuba, Venezuela, Brazil, Colombia, Greece, Serbia and Turkey have been fighting since 2022. The Khmelnytsky Battalion and Maxim Krivonos Battalion were created from Ukrainian residents.
- Several hundred Russian volunteers fought on the Serb side in the Yugoslav wars.

=== Serbian ===
- The Serbian Militia was a Serbian military unit of the Habsburg-Austrian army consisting of Serbs that existed between 1686 and 1704.
- Serbian Hussar Regiment was a military unit of the Russian Imperial Army which consisted of Serbian colonists in Russia.
- International Legion (Ukraine) spokesman confirms that there are indeed Serbian volunteers fighting in the legion alongside other volunteers.
- Volunteers from both Serbia and the Bosnian Serb entity, Republika Srpska, have fought on the Russian side in the Russo-Ukrainian war since 2014
- The Serb Volunteer Guard, Fought in the Croatian War of Independence and the Bosnian War supporting the Serb forces like the Army of Republika Srpska
- The Serbian Guard was a Serbian volunteer organization, armed wing of the Serbian Renewal Movement, active in Croatia in 1991
- Kninjas were Serbian volunteer organization commanded by Dragan Vasiljković, active in Croatia
- White Eagles were Serbian volunteer organization, armed wing of the Serbian Radical Party, active in Bosnia and Croatia
- Over 1,000 ethnic Serbs volunteered for the 7th SS Volunteer Mountain Division Prinz Eugen at General Phelps' office, most of whom were either ideologically or otherwise motivated to fight against the Partisans.
- The Serbian Volunteer Corps was an Axis collaborationist group during WWII that helped fight against partisan forces in Serbia
- First Serbian Volunteer Division was a military formation of the First World War. This independent volunteer unit was primarily made up of South Slav Habsburg prisoners of war, detained in Russia

=== Scottish ===
- Scots have a long history of service in the armies of Kings of France since at least the ninth century. The Scottish Guard was formally created by the French King Charles VII in 1422, and existed until the end of the Bourbon Restoration period in 1830.

=== South African ===
- South African 32 Battalion

=== Spanish ===
- The Blue Division of World War II fighting with Germany against the USSR.
- The Blue Legion was formed late in the Second World War out of Blue Division soldiers who refused to leave after Franco required all Spaniards to leave Axis forces.
- The 9th Armoured Company of the Free French Forces, which consisted of Spanish Republican exiles
- The Spanish Legion accepts foreign recruits.

=== Swedish ===
- 1,600 Swedes fought as part of the Swedish Brigade for the anti-communist side of the Finnish Civil War.
- Swedish volunteers took part in the Estonian War of Independence.
- Swedish Volunteer Corps fighting for the Finnish side in the Winter War.
- Swedish Voluntary Air Force fighting for the Finnish side in the Winter War.
- Swedish Volunteer Company fighting for the Finnish side in the Continuation War.
- Swedish Volunteer Battalion fighting for the Finnish side in the Continuation War.
- Hundreds of Swedes volunteered in the 5th SS Panzer Division Wiking to fight against the USSR.

=== Swiss ===
- Pontifical Swiss Guard
- Swiss mercenaries served under the flags of many European nations including the British, Dutch, French and Spanish; as well as continue to serve as the military of the Holy See.

=== Taiwanese ===
- Taiwanese Imperial Japan Serviceman
- Takasago Volunteers were volunteer soldiers in the Imperial Japanese Army recruited from the Taiwanese aboriginal tribes during World War II.

=== Ukrainian ===
- The 14th Waffen Grenadier Division of the SS (1st Galician) was made up nearly entirely of ethnic Ukrainians.
- The Ukrainian Liberation Army was a division of the Wehrmacht that fought all over Europe.
- The Nachtigall Battalion was a battalion of the Wehrmacht made up of Ukrainian nationalists who fought against the USSR.
- The Roland Battalion was a battalion of the Wehrmacht made up of Ukrainian nationalists who fought against the USSR.
- The Roland and Nachtigall battalions were later reorganized into the 201st Schutzmannschaft.
- The Ukrainian National Army fought against the USSR in the last days of WWII.
- Thousands of Hiwis were of Ukrainian origin.
- From several hundred to several thousand nationalist Ukrainians served in UNA-UNSO expeditionary units. UNSO took part in the Transnistrian War 1990-1992, the Chechen War 1994-1996 ("Viking" unit), and the war in Georgia 1991-1993 ("Argo" unit).
- Foreign volunteers joined the International Legion of Territorial Defense of Ukraine to defend Ukraine from the Russian Invasion in 2022.

=== Yugoslav ===
- Yugoslav brigadistas (Spanish: brigadistas yugoslavos), a contingent from the Kingdom of Yugoslavia who fought beside the Republican faction (In support of the government of the Second Spanish Republic).
- The 1st Yugoslav Volunteer Brigade, fought in World War II under Red Army command. Later became part of the Yugoslav Army.

== See also ==
- List of militaries that recruit foreigners
- Europäische Freiwillige of the Second World War
- Foreign legions
- Foreign fighter
- Mercenary
- Military volunteer
- Mujahideen
- Ghazi (warrior)
- Filibuster
- Partisan (military)
- Spanish Civil War and Foreign Involvement
- Foreign support in the Winter War
- White Tights, an urban legend concerning Baltic female snipers in Chechnya
- Spanish American wars of independence
