= Bengt Essén =

Swedish war veteran (1920–2020)

- Born: Bengt Rütgersson Essén; 12 August 1920; Yokohama, Japan
- Died: 13 August 2020 (aged 100)
- Known for: Volunteering for the Winter War

Bengt Rütgersson Essén (12 August 1920 – 13 August 2020) was a Swedish high school principal and a veteran of the Winter War between Finland and the Soviet Union.

== Early life ==
Essén was born in Yokohama, Japan to Rütger Essén and Ingeborg Essén. As a student, he went to Stockholm for his Christmas break, and three or four days before Christmas, he volunteered for service. At the age of 19 on New Year’s Eve 1939, he boarded a train to Haparanda with other volunteers. After a fifteen-day ski march, they arrived at the Salla border to join the Finnish armed forces. He was one of 9,500 Swedish volunteers who fought in the Finnish Winter War.

The corps he was in took over positions from the Finnish army, as they were sent to the Karelian Isthmus. His schedule was four hours of sleep and food and then four hours at the front. He also patrolled around the lines to spot possible attack routes and enemy locations.

Following the war, he distanced himself from his father’s pro-Nazi views, and during German attacks on Norway later in World War II, he joined a volunteer regiment to protect Swedish borders.

== Later life and death ==
Following the war, he worked as a paramedic and studied Swedish and History at Stockholm University. He became a high school teacher in the Solna Municipality and taught those subjects. In 1946 after meeting Venla Gebhard during a student exchange they married, after her death, he lived with Erica Ljungdahl until her death.

He gained attention for his role in the war later in his life and in 2016 was invited to the Slottsbalen.

Essén died on August 13, 2020, being the last living Swedish volunteer that fought in the Winter War.
