= Battle of Hanko (1941) =

Battle during the Continuation War

- Part of the Continuation War and Eastern Front
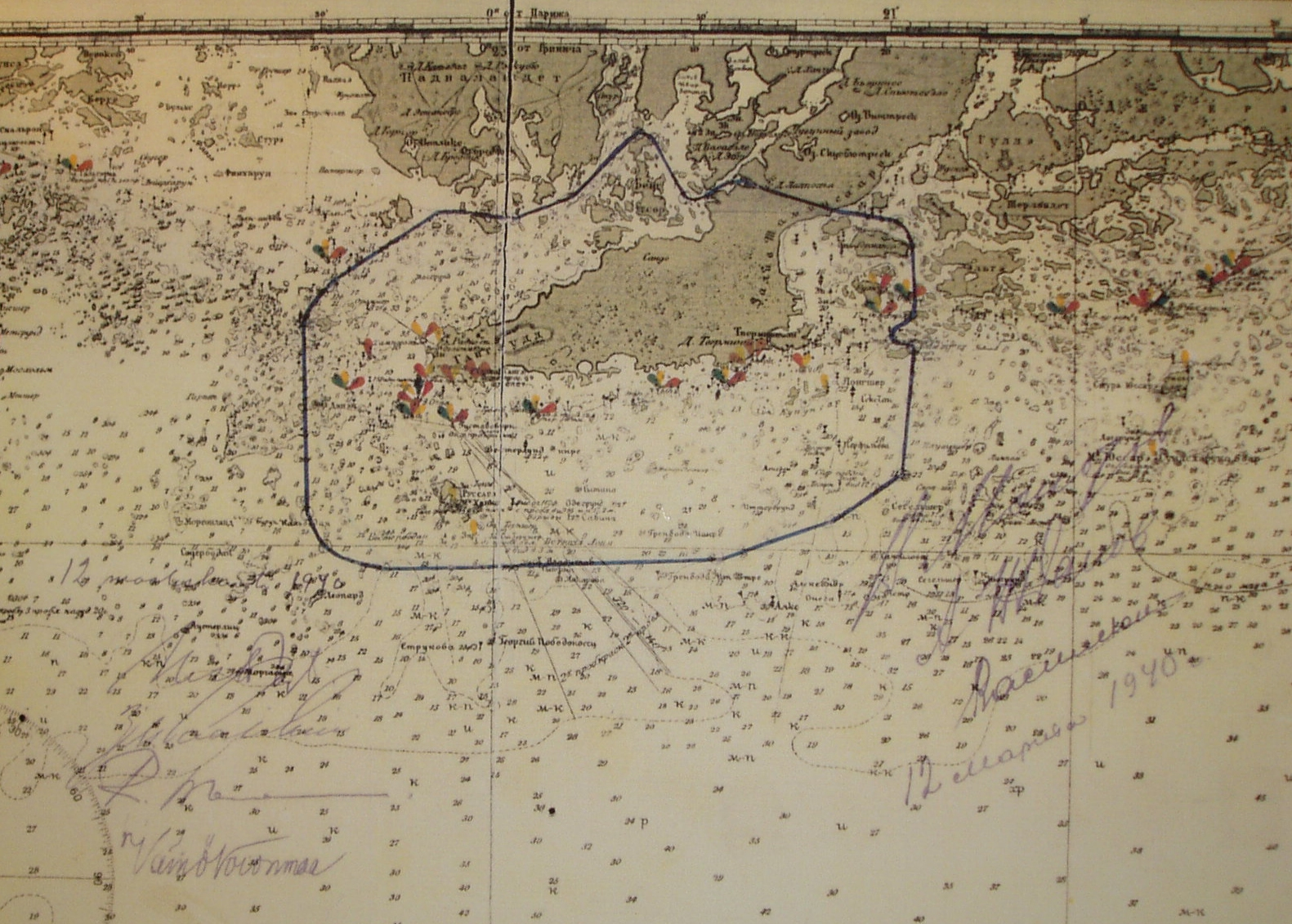
- Map showing the borders of the leased area
Date	22 June – 2 December 1941 (5 months, 1 week and 3 days)
Location	Hanko Peninsula, Finland 59°49′25″N 22°58′05″E
Result	Finnish victory; Soviet troops evacuated by sea; Finland retakes Hanko

Belligerents
Finland	Soviet Union

Strength
22,000 (July 1941); 12,500 (Autumn 1941)	25,300–30,000

Casualties and losses
297 killed 604 wounded 78 missing Total: 961	797 killed 1,476 wounded Estimated 3,000–5,000 killed during the evacuation from Hanko Total: 5,273–7,273

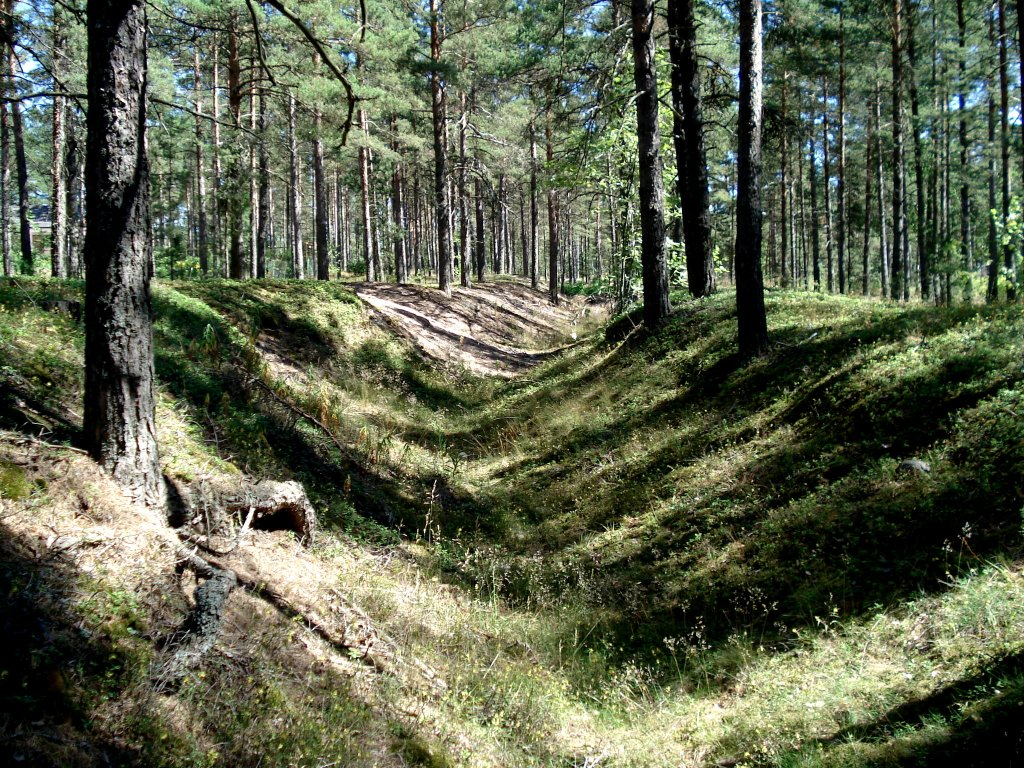
Remains of dugouts in the forest on the Hanko peninsula, just east of the town of Hanko.

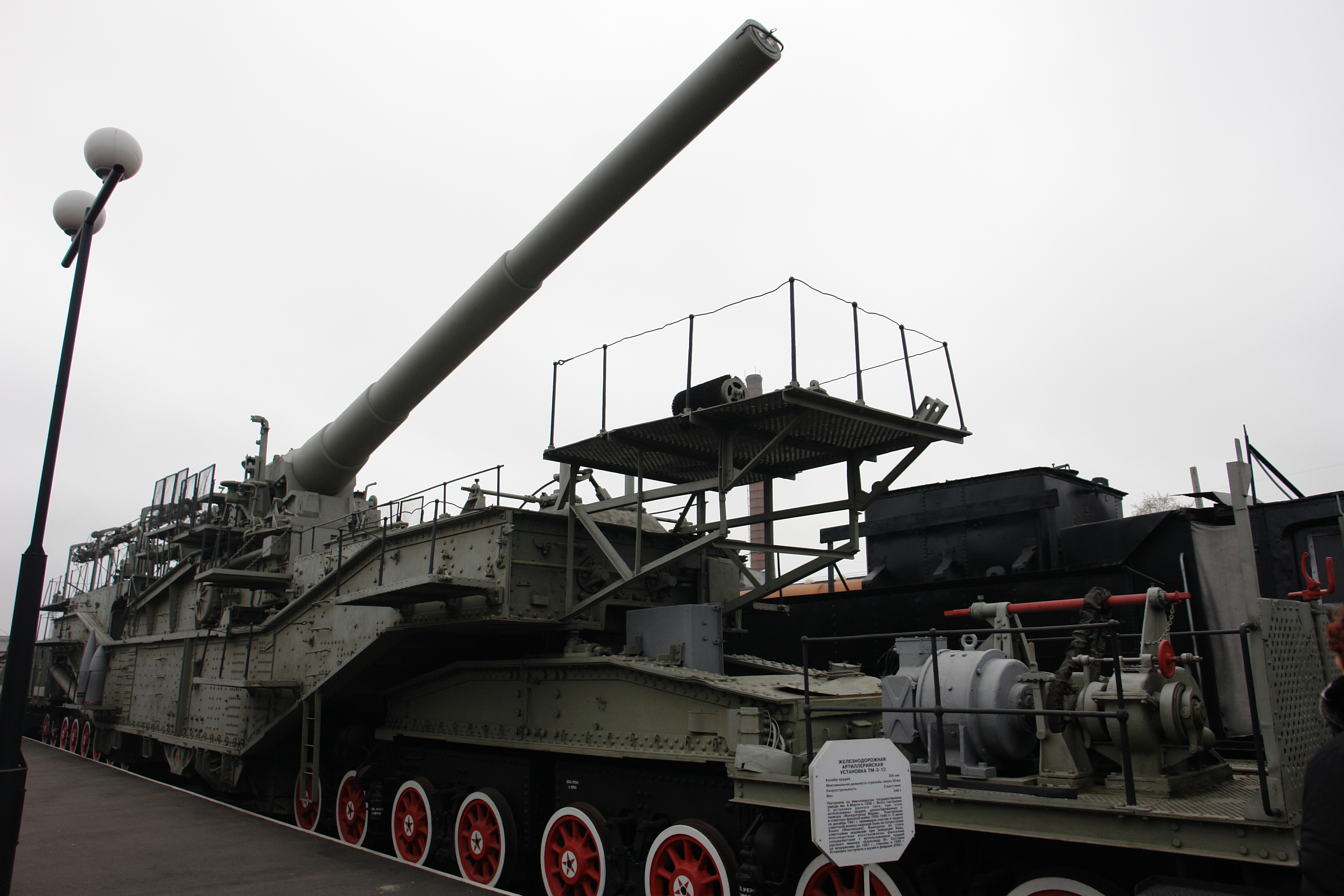
Railway artillery gun TM-3-12. In June–December 1941 it took part in the defence of the Soviet naval base on the Hanko peninsula.

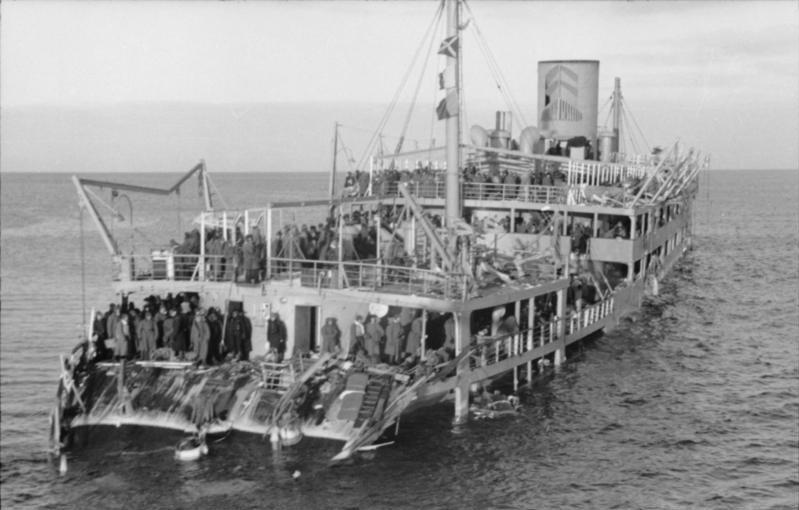
Soviet passenger ship Iosif Stalin, used for evacuation of troops from Hanko in November 1941, was damaged by a mine on 3 December 1941 and captured by the Germans.

The Battle of Hanko (also known as the Hanko front or the siege of Hanko) was a lengthy series of small battles fought on Hanko Peninsula during the Continuation War between Finland and the Soviet Union in the second half of 1941. As both sides were eager to avoid a major, costly ground battle, fighting took the form of trench warfare, with artillery exchanges, sniping, patrol clashes, and small amphibious operations performed in the surrounding archipelago. A Swedish Volunteer Battalion served with Finnish forces in the siege. The last Soviet troops left the peninsula in December 1941.

== Background ==
As part of the 1940 Moscow Peace Treaty which formally ended the Soviet-Finnish Winter War, Hanko was leased to the Soviet Union as a Soviet naval base. The civilian population was forced to evacuate before Soviet forces arrived. The leased area included several surrounding islands, several coastal artillery sites (among them the important fort of Russarö), important harbor facilities, and an area suitable for an airfield, which the Soviets quickly constructed. Troop transport rights from the Soviet Union to Hanko and back put severe strain on Finnish-Soviet relations, and played a part both in Finland's decision to allow German troops to transit Northern Finland, and later, to go to war with the Soviet Union. Though Hanko had originally been leased as a naval base, ground forces were far more numerous, with only a small naval detachment being present at the base.

== Operations ==
At the start of the war, Finnish ground troops quickly isolated Hanko and its 25,300-man Soviet garrison. Though Mannerheim initially declared that liberating Hanko would be a primary goal of the war, Finnish troops in the area did not receive authorization to attack the base. Instead, as the Finns had built the Harparskog line on the border of the leased area during the Interim Peace, they moved to occupy these positions. The front remained mostly static, with action consisting mainly of artillery strikes and some limited probing or patrol activities on both sides. Small scale naval and amphibious actions took place in the surrounding archipelago. Finnish forces surrounding the base initially consisted of the 17th Division, the 4th Coastal Brigade, and supporting units. By the end of the summer, the 17th Division, which had made up the bulk of the besieging force, was transferred to East Karelia.

Finnish efforts to blockade the base from the sea were less successful, due both to strong Soviet resistance, and to equipment failures (such as torpedoes used by Finnish submarines, which often failed to detonate on impact). Minefields laid on the sea lanes leading to Hanko and the surrounding waters were more effective, claiming several Soviet supply vessels. These problems, in addition to the rapid German advance on the southern shore of the Gulf of Finland, caused the base to lose its importance and made it an untenably heavy burden for the Soviet Baltic Fleet. In autumn 1941 the order was given to evacuate Hanko. Base personnel, troops and most of their light equipment and supplies had been removed by December 1941. Heavier equipment which couldn't be readily moved was sabotaged or destroyed in place. Soviet naval forces performing the evacuation suffered heavy losses from minefields.

The Soviet base at Hanko, its accompanying coastal fort at Osmussaar, and the minefields laid to protect the Soviet Baltic Fleet, had hindered Finnish and German naval activities, and had made it problematic for freighters to reach the Finnish ports of Helsinki and Kotka. As Finland lacked the resources to transport enough goods over land, this caused severe logistical problems, with material stuck in seaports on the Western coast. Finnish and German minesweepers opened a sea-lane through the minefields outside of the gun range of Russarö to allow freighters to reach even the Eastern ports, but it wasn't until the Soviet evacuation that they were able to clear the more secure coastal sea-lane, allowing safer passage.

=== Amphibious operations ===
Both Finnish and Soviet coastal forces conducted numerous small-scale amphibious operations in the archipelago surrounding the Hanko Peninsula. The first of these clashes took place at the beginning of July 1941; active operations ended the following October. Fighting on these small islands was often fierce, and withdrawing from them under fire was extremely hazardous. In general the operations had little effect on the overall battle, as territorial gains remained negligible.

=== Battle of Bengtskär ===
After capturing the small island of Morgonlandet in July 1941, Soviet forces launched a small-scale amphibious assault against the Finnish island of Bengtskär, which had a lighthouse and was thus an important observation post. The initial landing, performed in the middle of the night in foggy conditions, was successful, as Finnish sentries believed the approaching boats to be German minesweepers; however, the small garrison recovered quickly. Putting up fierce resistance, the Finns managed to retain control of the lighthouse while summoning help from nearby naval forces and coastal artillery. The fighting continued throughout the night. In the morning Finnish reinforcements were able to force the remaining Soviet raiders to surrender and drive their naval support away.

=== Evacuation ===
Hanko was evacuated in several convoys between 16 October and 1 December 1941. Roughly 23,000 troops were transported to Leningrad. The fleet suffered losses to Finnish minefields and coastal artillery, losing three destroyers, two large transports (Andrei Zhdanov and Iosif Stalin), and several smaller vessels. Finnish troops entering the area found it heavily mined.

== See also ==
- Baltic Sea campaigns (1939–1945)
