= 664th Eastern Battalion =

Ost-Bataillon 664
- Active: February 1942 to December 1943
- Allegiance: Nazi Germany
- Branch: Wehrmacht
- Type: Foreign volunteer
- Role: Bandenbekämpfung
- Size: Battalion
- Part of: Army Group North
- Engagements: World War II

The 664th Eastern Battalion was an Ingrian Finnish Eastern battalion in the Wehrmacht, with its main purpose being fighting partisans and guarding railways.

Unlike many collaborator units that suffered from defection, 664th Eastern Battalion was considered reliable and over 100 members of the unit were awarded with the Medal for Gallantry and Merit for Members of the Eastern Peoples. The unit was responsible for multiple massacres of civilians.

In December 1943, the unit was transferred to the Finnish Defence Forces where it was reorganized as Separate Battalion 6.

== Background ==
After the Germans took over Ingria (modern Leningrad Oblast) in Operation Barbarossa, the Finns living in there were recruited in 1942 into a Wehrmacht unit called Finnische Sicherheitsgruppe 187 (Finnish Security Group 187). Within a year of its establishment, it included 27th, 28th, 29th, and 30th Hundertschaft, each consisting of 170 men. The name of the group was later changed to Ost-Bataillon 664 ('664th Eastern Battalion') in the fall of 1942. The main task of the battalion was to protect the Leningrad–Dno- and Luga–Novgorod- railway lines. The battalion headquarters were located in Batetskaya, an important crossroads.

== Atrocities ==
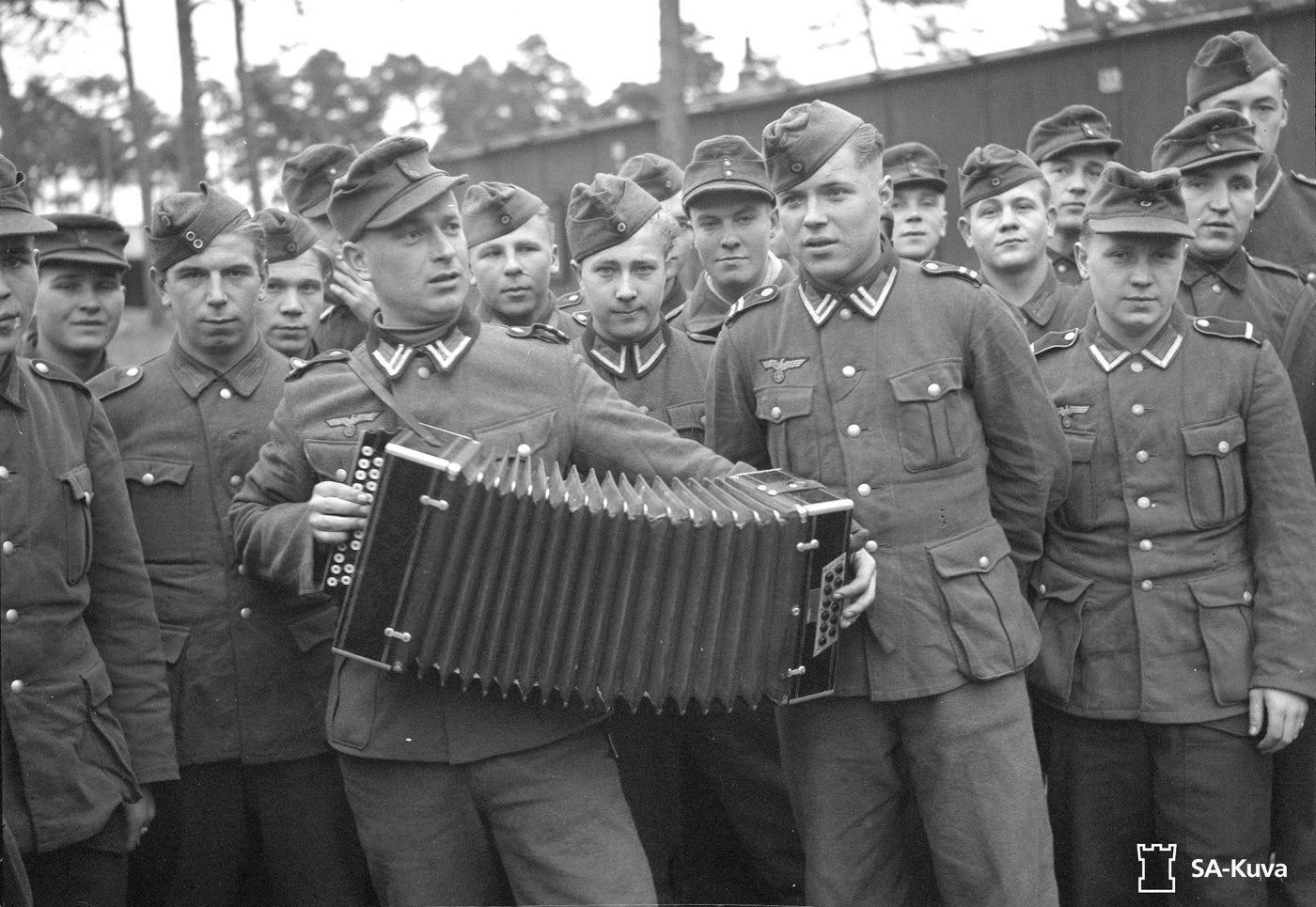
Ingrian Wehrmacht volunteers of the battalion, 1943

According to an Iltalehti article by Boris Salomon, the Ingrians were responsible for multiple atrocities, and shocked even their German officers. Juhani Jääskeläinen, a military chaplain, wrote in his report that:

"The national feeling is strong and the hatred of Russians runs deep. The German sergeant complained that these Finns do not understand that the Germans have to be friendly to the Russians because of the current situation".

In the opinion of the Germans the anti-Russian sentiment of the Ingrian Finns ran too deep. A Sicherheitsdienst report explains how Mikko Fedotow was separated from the 664th Eastern Battalion because

"Fedotow says he hates Russians deeply and is always quick to anger. Since Fedotow thinks every Russian is a communist and has often threatened his friends with a gun, he is not qualified for military service".

In one example of extreme cruelty, a unit consisting of Germans, Ingrians and Estonians carried out a massacre of Romani residents of the village of Filippovsshina in February 1942. They forced the villagers to dance for their own amusement in −30 °C weather and then shot them with three machine guns. In another case, the Ingrians and Germans hanged a group of Jews and Romas in the town center in Krasnogvardeisk. The Ingrians were at least present when a whole Roma family was hanged in a village near Luga.

== End of the Battalion ==
When Ingrian civilians began to be transferred to Finland in March 1943 from German-occupied areas, some Ingrian men who served in the Wehrmacht also expressed the wish for a transfer to Finland. After the negotiations between the Germans and Finns, it was decided to move the battalion to Finland and merge it with the Finnish Army. The transfers were made from Estonia by ship in early December. Under the Finnish command, the unit was reorganized as the Separate Battalion 6.
