= Swedish Volunteer Company =

Swedish volunteer soldiers in the Finnish army

- Svenska frivilligkompaniet
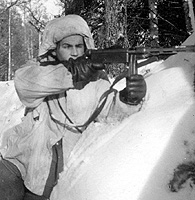
- Swedish volunteer with a KP-31 at the River Svir in 1943
- Active: 1942 – 26 September 1944
- Allegiance: Finland
- Type: Foreign volunteer
- Role: Infantry
- Size: 434 men (total number who served); 160 men (peak strength)
- Nickname: Svir Company
- Engagements: Continuation War

The Swedish Volunteer Company (Swedish: Svenska frivilligkompaniet), or the Svir Company (Svirkompaniet), was a company of Swedish volunteer soldiers in the Finnish Army during the Continuation War fought by Finland and Nazi Germany against the Soviet Union in World War II. In January 1942, the company succeeded the Swedish Volunteer Battalion that had been disestablished after the Battle of Hanko in December 1941.

The Swedish Volunteer Company fought on the River Svir Front in Finnish-occupied East Karelia from 1942 to 1944, and in the largest battle in Nordic history, the Battle of Tali–Ihantala on the Karelian Isthmus in 1944. At least 412 Swedes, 18 assigned regular Finnish soldiers, three Danes and an Estonian-Swede belonged to the unit during its existence. The highest simultaneous number of soldiers in the company was 160, and 39 were killed.

The unit was disestablished on 26 September 1944 following the Moscow Armistice on 19 September 1944.

== See also ==
- Swedish Volunteer Corps
- Swedish Voluntary Air Force
- Swedish Volunteer Battalion

== Citations ==
WWII-stub
