= Military volunteer =

Person who enlists in military service by free will

A military volunteer (or war volunteer) is a person who enlists in military service by free will, and is not a conscript, mercenary, or a foreign legionnaire. Volunteers sometimes enlist to fight in the armed forces of a foreign country, for example during the Spanish Civil War. Military volunteers are essential for the operation of volunteer militaries. Many armies, including the U.S. Army, formerly distinguished between "Important Volunteers" enlisted during a war, and "regulars" who served on long-term basis.

== United States ==
In the United States troops raised as state militia were always described as "volunteers", even when recruited by conscription. Both US volunteers and regulars were referred to as "U.S." troops. The rank of an officer in a volunteer unit was separate from his rank (if any) as a regular, and usually higher. When the volunteer forces were disbanded at the end of the war, officers with both kinds of commission reverted to their "regular" rank. For instance, George Armstrong Custer became a brigadier general of volunteers during the American Civil War, but when the war ended, he reverted to captain. (He was later promoted to lieutenant colonel.) Volunteer rank is not the same as brevet rank.

== Gallery ==
Military volunteers

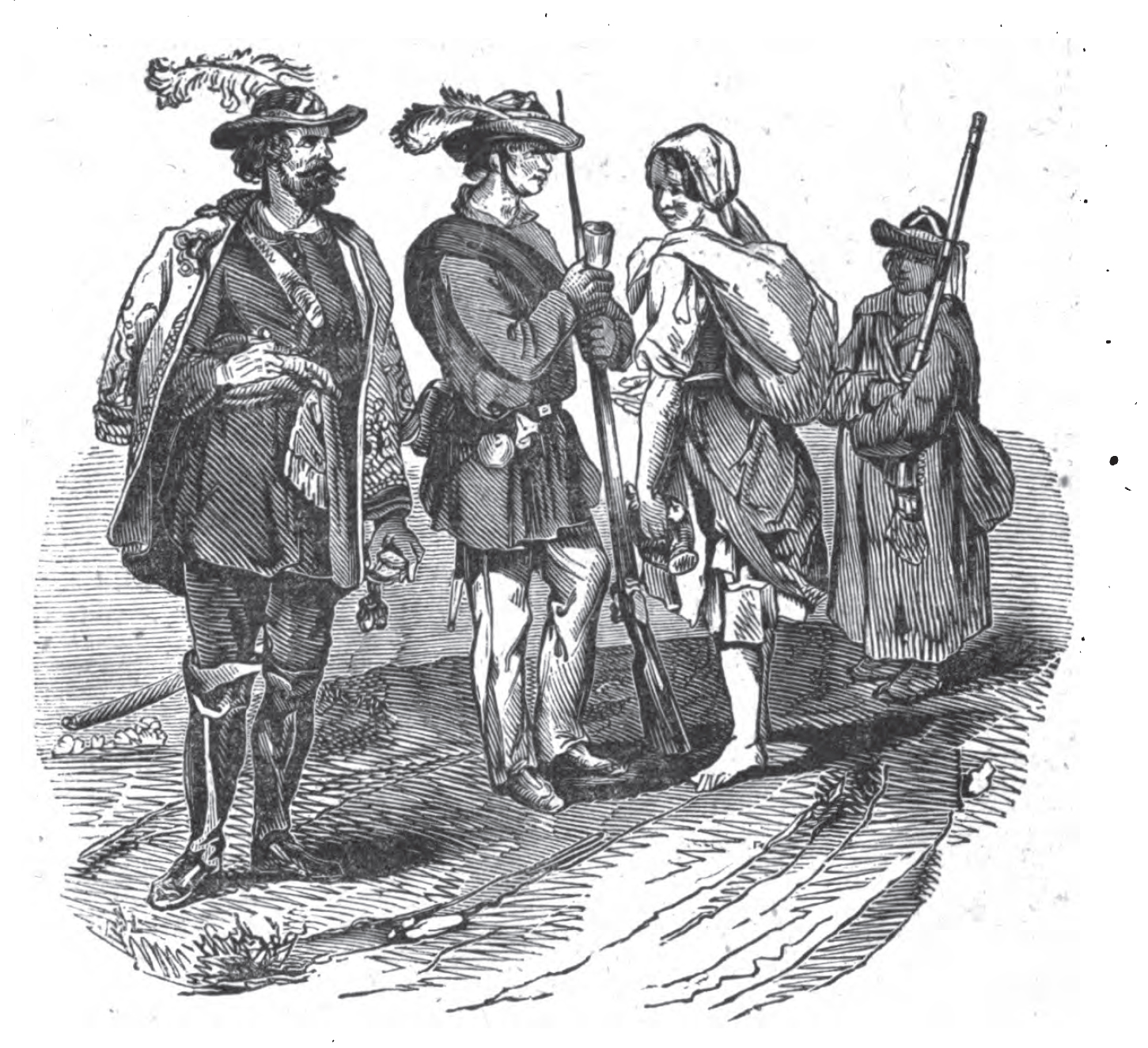
Slovak volunteers in the Slovak Uprising of 1848–1849

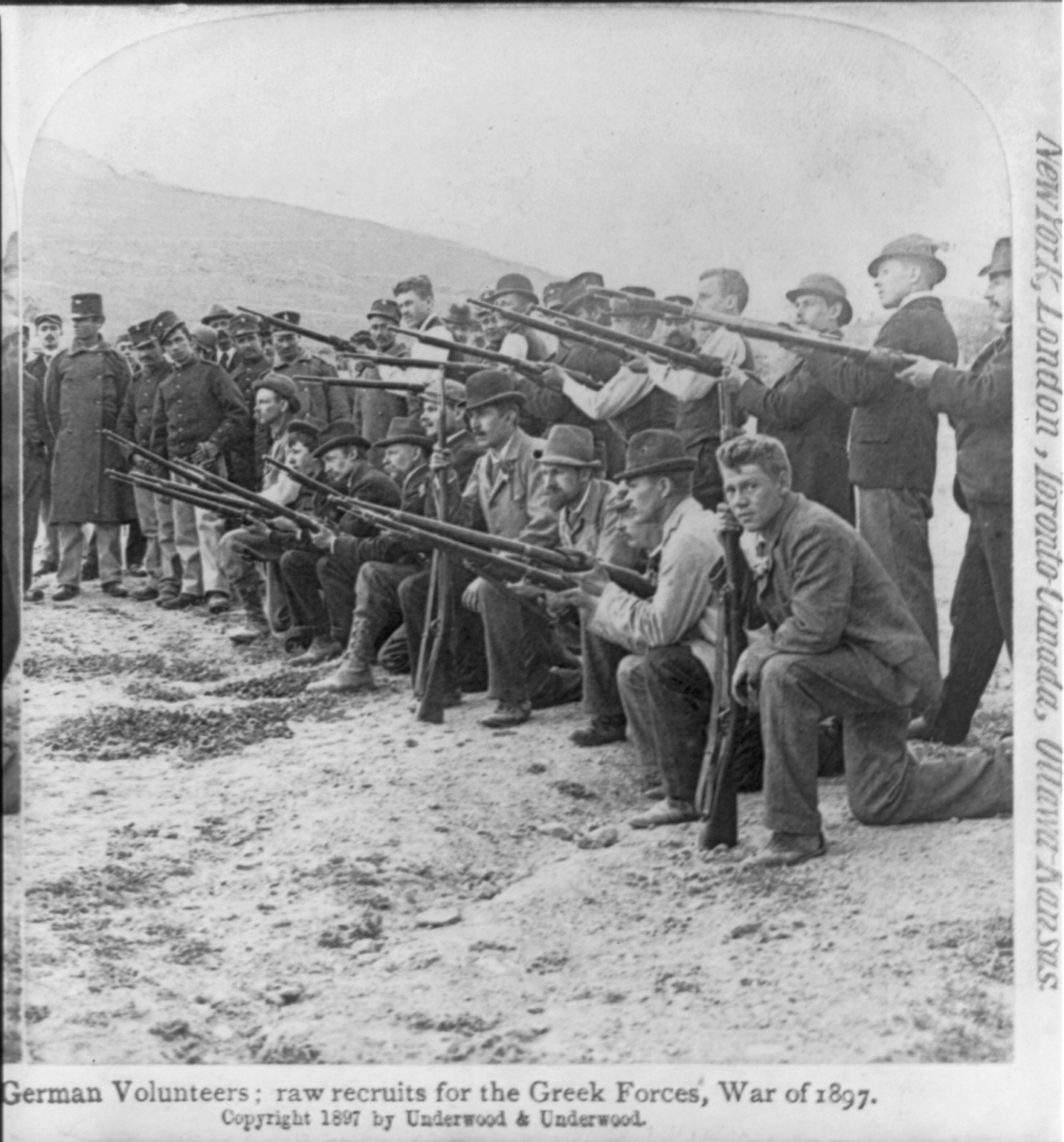
German volunteers for the Greek forces in Greco-Turkish War of 1897

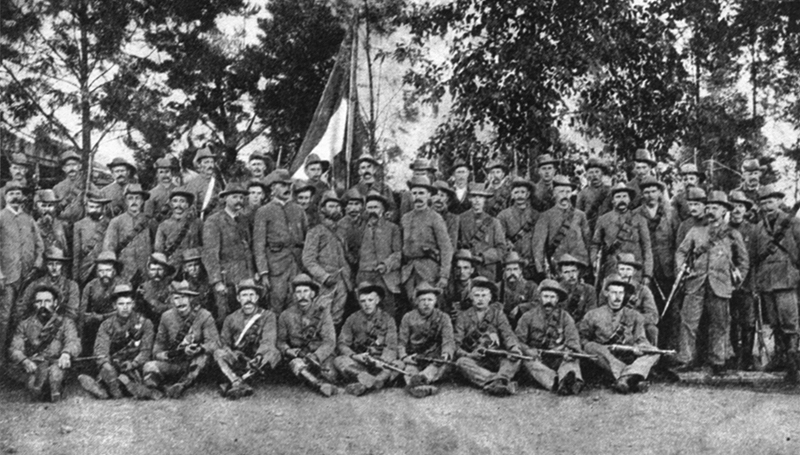
Scandinavian Corps volunteers in Boer Commando Army in the Boer War of 1899–1902

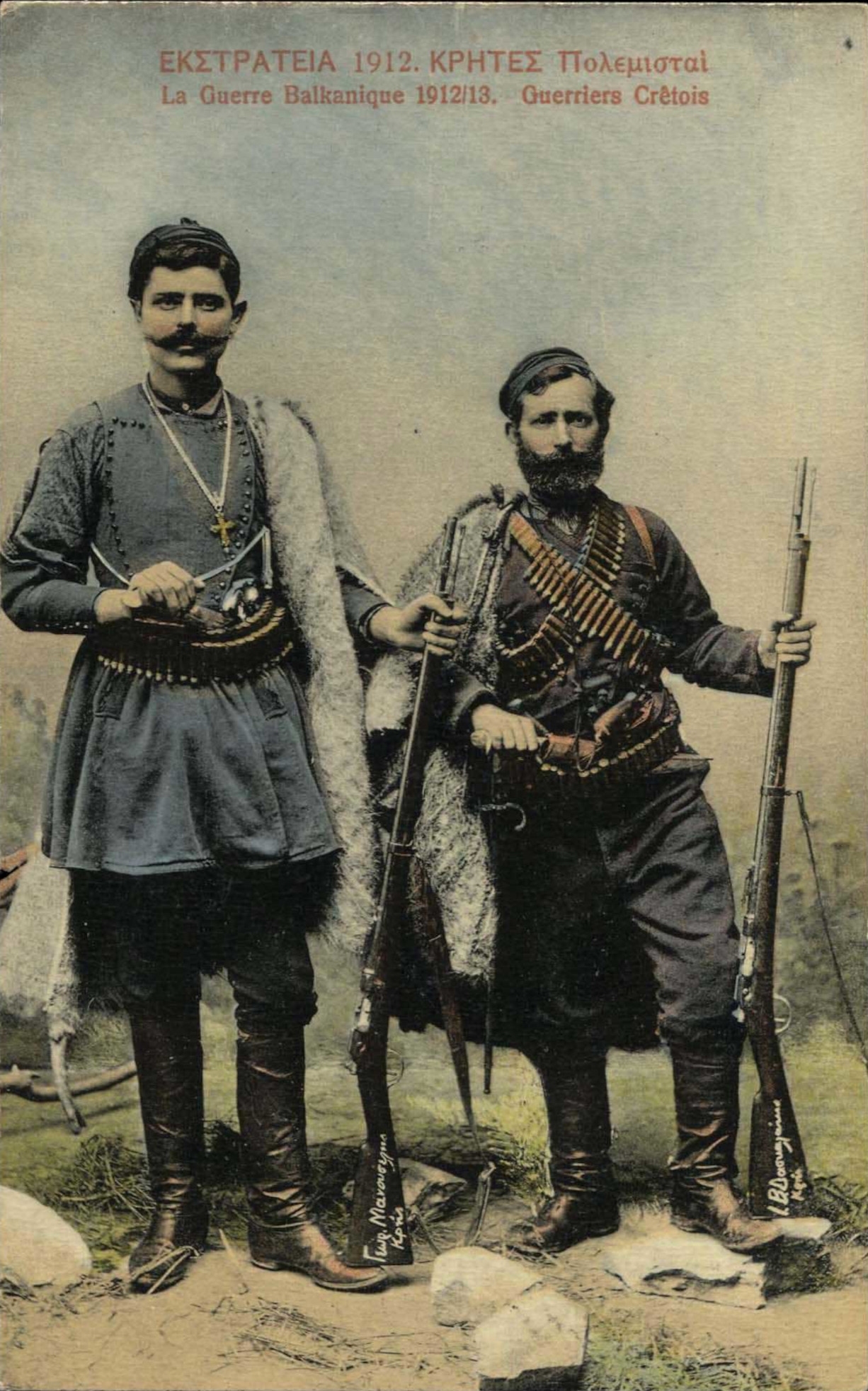
Cretan volunteers in the First Balkan War of 1912–1913

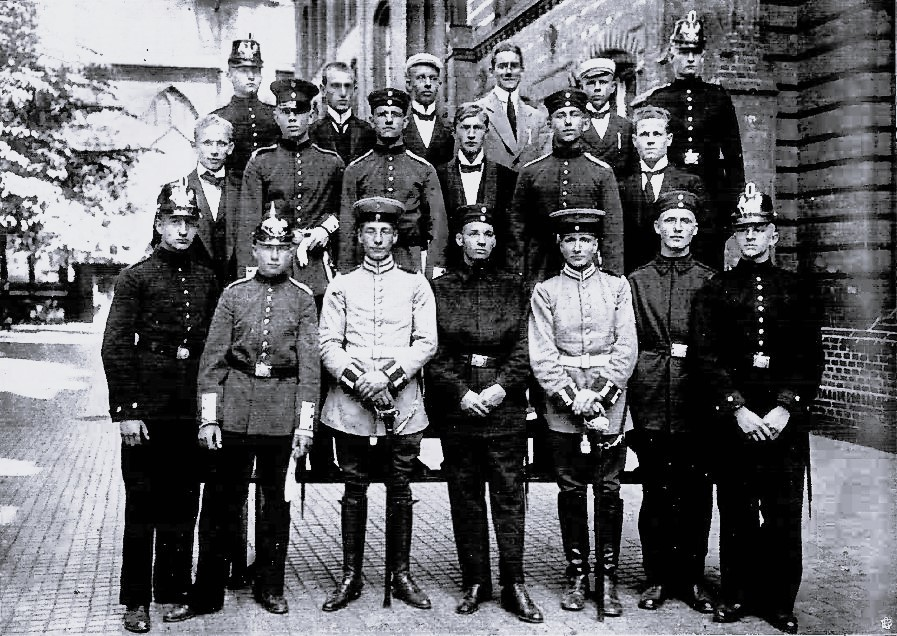
War volunteers of the Katharineum on 17 August 1914 (World War I)

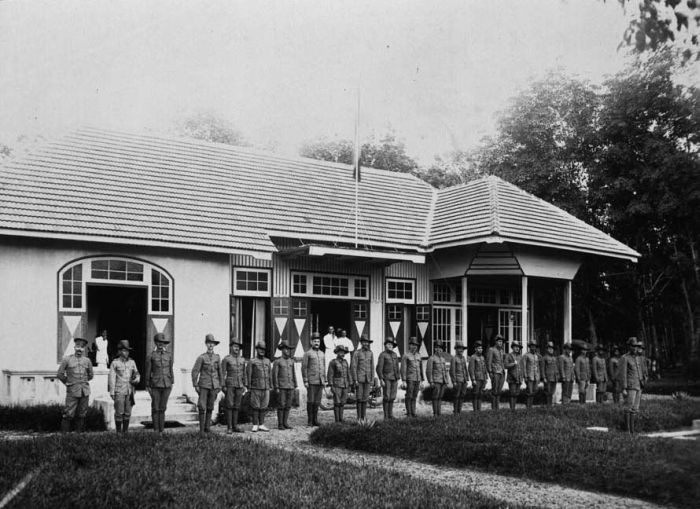
Dutch volunteers corps in Dutch East Indies in 1918

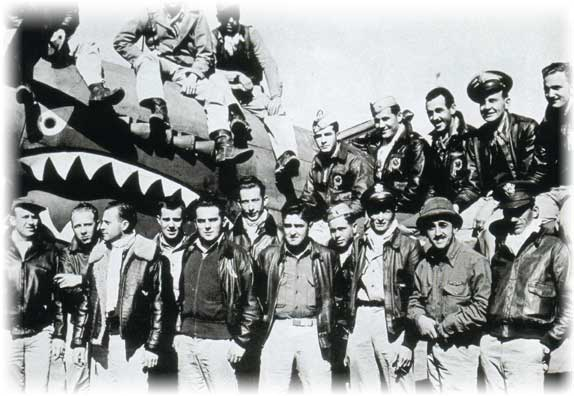
Flying Tigers, American volunteers in war-torn WWII Japanese occupied-China from 1942–1944

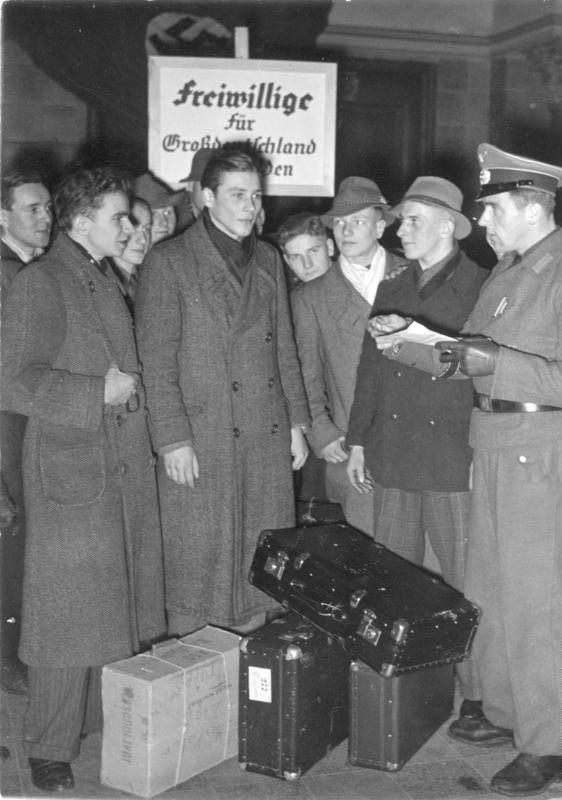
Panzer-Grenadier-Division Großdeutschland German volunteers arrive at train station, during WWII, to fight on the Russian Eastern Front in February 1944

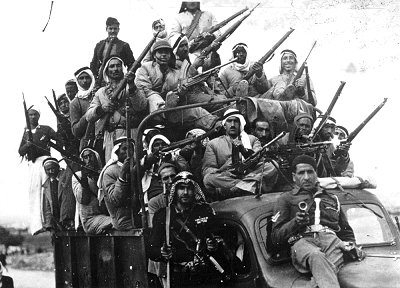
Palestinian Arab volunteers in "Army of the Holy War" in 1947 fighting in the British Mandate of Palestine during Palestinian Civil War of 1947–1948

== See also ==
- Volunteer military
- Volunteer Force, volunteer units in the 19th century British Empire
- Sar-El, national project for volunteers for Israel
- SAF Volunteer Corps, volunteer scheme for the Singapore Armed Forces
- Foreign involvement in the Spanish Civil War
- Corpo Truppe Volontarie
- Wehrmacht foreign volunteers and conscripts
- International Freedom Battalion, units consisting of foreign fighters partaking in the war against the Islamic State of Iraq and the Levant
- Volunteering in a non-military context means working voluntarily without pay
