= Swedish Volunteer Corps =

Swedish all-volunteer corps during the Winter War

- Svenska frivilligkåren
- Active: 28 February 1940 – 28 March 1940
- Allegiance: Finland
- Type: Foreign volunteer
- Role: Infantry
- Size: 9,640 men
- Engagements: Winter War

Commanders
- Notable commanders: General Ernst Linder

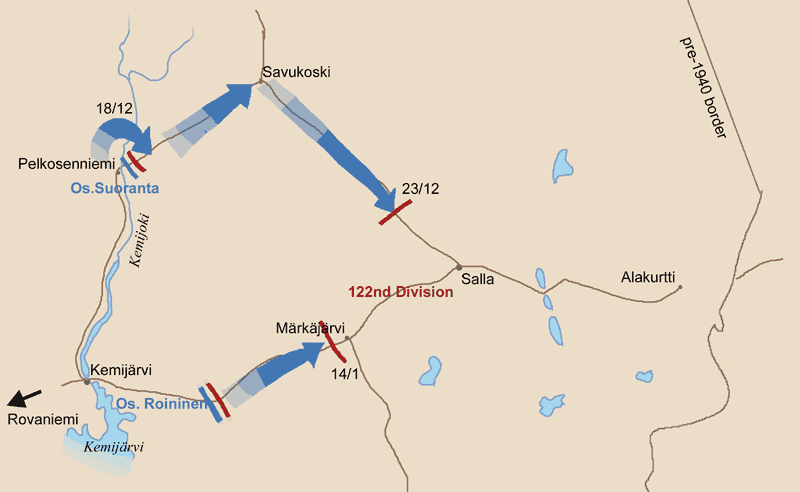
Swedish Volunteer Corps and Osasto Roininen (Detachment Roininen) in Salla

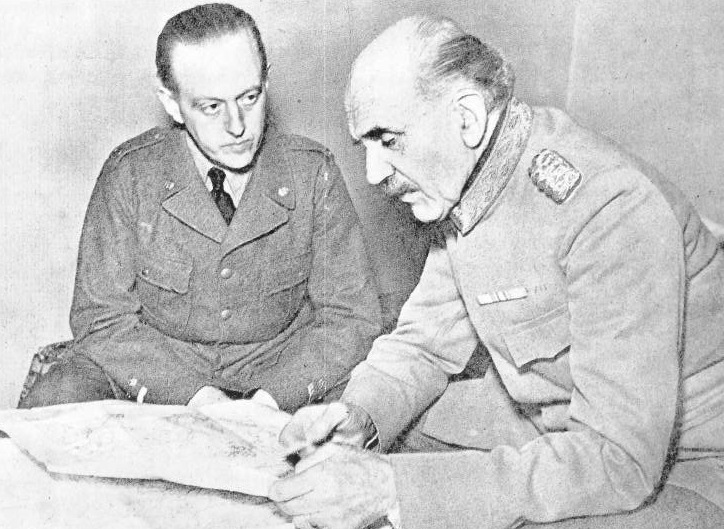
The Commander of Swedish volunteers General Ernst Linder (right) and his Chief of Staff Carl August Ehrensvärd in Tornio

The Swedish Volunteer Corps (Swedish: Svenska frivilligkåren) during the Winter War numbered 9,640 officers and men. Sweden was officially non-belligerent during the war, so the Corps was used by Finland. The Swedish volunteers were in the front lines in the northern Salla area starting from February 28, 1940. Their losses included 33 dead, 10 missing, 50 wounded, and 130 disabled by frostbite. There were also 25 aircraft that served in the Swedish Voluntary Air Force, F19. Swedish volunteers also defended Turku in an anti-aircraft battery.

By the end of the war, the Volunteer Corps was composed of 8,260 Swedes, plus 725 Norwegians, and 600 Danes. They demonstrated a strong Nordic unity that was symbolized in their "four brother hands" insignia which represented Finland, Sweden, Norway, and Denmark.

The Volunteer Corps preceded the Swedish Volunteer Battalion and the Swedish Volunteer Company in World War II.

== Commanders ==
- 1940: General Ernst Linder

== Organization ==
Swedish Volunteer Corps - Svenska Frivilligkåren

  - I. stridsgruppen (Lieutenant-Colonel Magnus Dyrssen †, Captain Carl C:son Bonde, Lieutenant-Colonel Carl-Oscar Agell)
    - 1. skyttekompaniet
    - 2. skyttekompaniet
    - 3. skyttekompaniet
    - 4. jägarkompaniet
    - 5. tunga kompaniet
    - 1. batteriet
    - 1. plogplutonen
    - 1. signalplutonen
  - II. stridsgruppen (Lieutenant-Colonel Viking Tamm)
    - 1. skyttekompaniet
    - 2. skyttekompaniet
    - 3. skyttekompaniet
    - 4. jägarkompaniet
    - 5. tunga kompaniet
    - 2. batteriet
    - 2. plogplutonen
    - 2. signalplutonen
  - III. stridsgruppen (Lieutenant-Colonel Martin Ekström)
    - 1. skyttekompaniet
    - 2. skyttekompaniet
    - 3. skyttekompaniet
    - 4. jägarkompaniet
    - 5. tunga kompaniet
    - 3. batteriet
    - 3. plogplutonen
    - 3. signalplutonen
  - Other units:
    - 1. pansarvärnsplutonen
    - 2. pansarvärnsplutonen
    - Luftvärnskompaniet
    - Ingenjörkompaniet
    - 16. självständiga jägarkompaniet
    - (17. självständiga jägarkompaniet)
    - Intendenturkompaniet
    - Vägkompaniet
    - 1. bilkompaniet
    - 2. bilkompaniet
    - Anspannskompaniet
    - 1. sjukvårdsplutonen
    - 2. sjukvårdsplutonen
    - Hästambulans
    - Ambulans
    - F 19

== Weapons ==
- 7.5 cm Guns M/02
- 40mm Anti Aircraft Guns M/36
- 7.5 cm Anti Aircraft guns
- 20mm Automatic Cannons
- 3.7 cm Anti Tank guns M/38
- 8 cm Mortars M/29
- 13mm Anti Tank Rifles

== Vehicles ==
- 83 motorcycles
- 83 cars
- 350 trucks
- 13 tractors

== Casualties ==
33 men of the Swedish Volunteer Corps were killed. These were:

ID no.	Name	Born	Rank	Unit	Date killed	Note
753	Zachau, Anders Robert	1906-08-31	Löjtnant	Air Force	1940-01-12	(Note: The 33-year-old Anders Zachau, a forest officer from Uddevalla, followed his aircraft to the ground and was killed. He thus became the first person of the Swedish Air Force who died in battle. His remains were found in 1942 and was then transferred to Sweden for burial in Uddevalla. His name is remembered in the Swedish Air Force Memorial Hall.)
897	Sjöqvist, John Magnus	1918-09-23	Fänrik	Air Force	1940-01-23	
2121	Sjödin, Sven Adolf	1916-04-19	Private	II grp, stabskomp.	1940-02-23	
3399	Persson, Helmer Ove Albin	1915-03-04	Översergeant	II grp, stabskomp.	1940-02-23	
553	Dyrssen, Magnus Peder Vilhelm	1894-05-18	Överstelöjtnant	Cmdr, I grp	1940-03-01	
2437	Wibble, Per Arne	1920-03-23	Private	II grp, 3. skkomp.	1940-03-01	
3347	Hjukström, Evald Ossian	1909-06-22	Översergeant	II grp, 4. jkomp.	1940-03-02	
230	Hömqvist, Gunnar Ingemar	1915-03-11	Översergeant	II grp, 4. jkomp.	1940-03-02	
9076	Svensson-Myhr, Olof	1912-10-08	Översergeant	II grp, 4. jkomp.	1940-03-02	
2601	Wallman, Helge Bernhard	1913-07-12	Sergeant	II grp, 4. jkomp.	1940-03-02	
2595	Johansson, Karl Jonas Adolf	1912-07-14	Private	II grp, 4. jkomp.	1940-03-02	
1342	Karlsson, Gustaf Per	1915-06-11	Private	II grp, 4. jkomp.	1940-03-02	(Note: Per-Gustaf Karlsson from Morjärv was badly wounded on 2 March 1940, behind the Soviet front line at Märkäjärvi, but could not be brought back to his own line. After the end of the Continuation War, a body was found buried at a former Soviet medical site. The remains could not be identified and were placed in a German mass grave at Kellosälkä (Salla area). When the German casualties there were taken to Germany, it was noted that it was Per-Gustaf Carlsson's remains. The funeral service could then take place at Morjärv Church on 17 January 1960 with interment at its cemetery.)
4149	Palm, Knut Algot	1918-05-13	Private	II grp, 4. jkomp.	1940-03-02	
2742	Öjstad, Torbjörn	1916-02-04	Fänrik	II grp, 4. jkomp.	1940-03-02	
389	Janson, Bror Sixten Valdemar	1908-03-29	Sergeant	II grp, 4. jkomp.	1940-03-02	
1349	Johansson, Linus J. W.	1917-02-28	Private	II grp, 4. jkomp.	1940-03-02	
1555	Andersson, Arvid	1912-01-26	Norwegian Private	I grp, 3. skkomp.	1940-03-02	
681	Wemstedt, Melcher Wasa Bo G.	1909-09-22	Löjtnant	I grp, stabskomp.	1940-03-07	
2210	Winlöf, Karl Erik	1893-10-30	Private	I grp, 4. jkomp.	1940-03-07	
8444	Thegerström, Jan Henrik	1918-01-16	Private	II grp, 3. skkomp.	1940-03-08	
752	Hildinger, Sten Åke	1914-06-06	Löjtnant	Air Force	1940-03-10	
9404	Christensen, Abraham, Joh.	1891-12-19	Norwegian Private	II grp, 1. skkomp.	1940-03-10	
2352	Roth, Carl Willy	1908-11-23	Private	2. bilkomp.	1940-03-12	
2431	Jonsson, Anders	1917-09-04	Översergeant	2. bilkomp.	1940-03-12	
2185	Cederborg, Knut Ragnar	1910-10-01	Private	I grp, 1. skkomp.	1940-03-13	
3893	Eriksson, Filip E. Volger	1905-07-27	Private	I grp, 3. skkomp.	1940-03-13	
8301	Andersson, Bernt Einar	1917-05-22	Private	II grp, 4. jkomp.	1940-03-13	
3298	Brandin, Bror Atle	1910-12-02	Private	II grp, 4. jkomp.	1940-03-13	
255	Svensson, Karl Olle August	1915-09-14	Sergeant	II grp, 4. jkomp.	1940-03-13	
3242	Gustafsson, Gustaf	1910-06-10	Private	2. pvplut.	1940-03-13	
8389	Johansson, Erik Harald	1914-01-15	Private	2. pvplut.	1940-03-13	
2592	Lindegren, Anders Hugo	1916-05-13	Private	2. pvplut.	1940-03-13	
8686	Månsson, Gösta Georg	1897-09-13	Sergeant	II grp, 2. skkomp.	1940-03-31	

== See also ==
- Sweden and the Winter War
- Swedish Voluntary Air Force
- Swedish Volunteer Battalion
- Swedish Volunteer Company
