= Hanko Peninsula =

Southernmost tip of Finland

Coordinates: 59°50′N 23°5′E

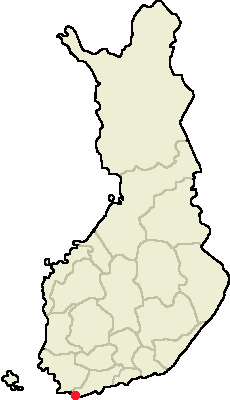
Location of the Hanko Peninsula

The Hanko Peninsula (Finnish: Hankoniemi; Swedish: Hangö udd) is the southernmost point of mainland Finland. The soil is a sandy moraine, the last tip of the Salpausselkä ridge, and vegetation consists mainly of pine and low shrubs. The peninsula is known for its beautiful archipelago and long sandy beaches.

The town of Hanko is situated on the peninsula, as is the Port of Hanko.

The Baltic Sea proper is demarcated by a line from the Hanko Peninsula to the northwesternmost point of mainland Estonia. The waters east of this line are considered the Gulf of Finland.

Map of Hanko Peninsula

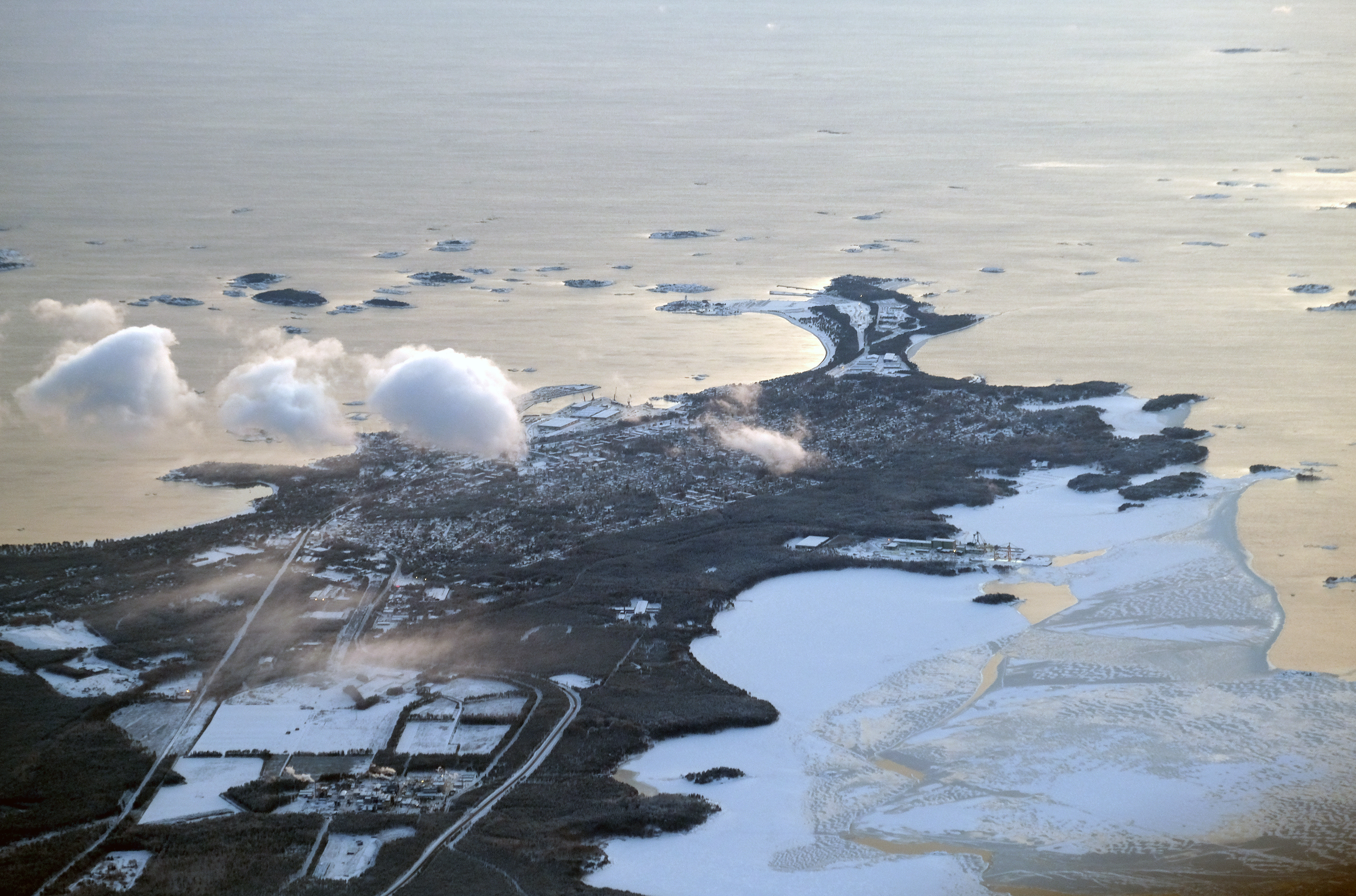
Aerial view of Hanko Peninsula

The Hanko Peninsula has played a major part during times of war. The Battle of Gangut was fought outside the Hanko peninsula on 7 August 1714 ("Gangut" is the Russian transliteration of the Swedish name for the peninsula "Hangö udd"). Some of the Russian fortifications that were built as part of Peter the Great's Naval Fortress are located here. During the Finnish Civil War, the German Ostsee Division landed here in April 1918.

Following the Winter War, the southern part of the peninsula with the town of Hanko was leased to the Soviet Union for 30 years, where the Hanko Naval Base was established. However, the Soviets evacuated their 25,000 soldiers in the area during the Continuation War and it was retaken by the Finns and the Swedish Volunteer Battalion in December 1941.
