= Swedish Volunteer Battalion =

- Svenska frivilligbataljonen
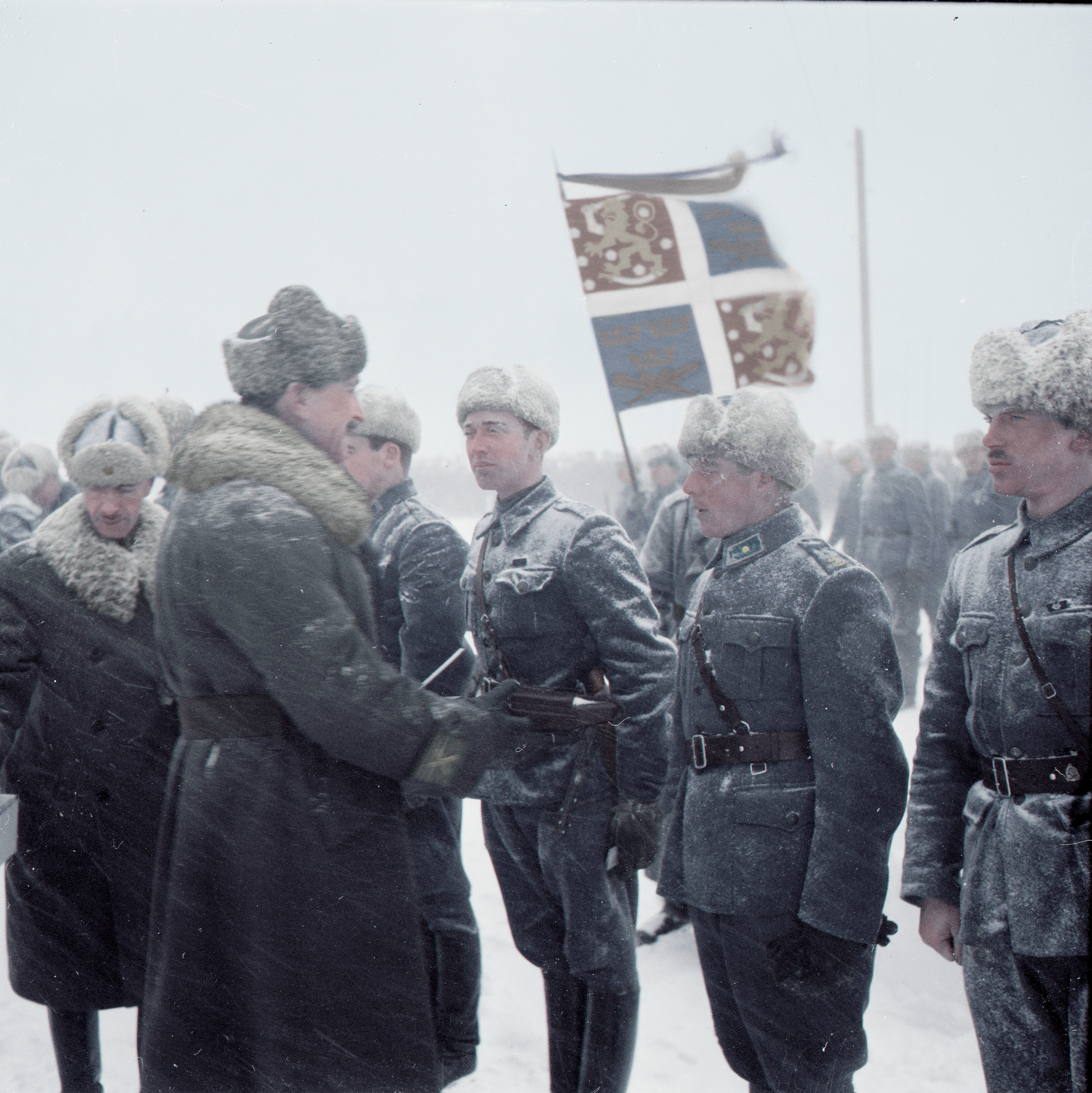
- Field marshal Gustaf Mannerheim greeting members of the Swedish Volunteer Battalion, Hanko, Finland 1941
- Active: 10 August 1941 – 15 December 1941
- Allegiance: Finland
- Type: Foreign volunteer
- Role: Infantry
- Size: 1,000 men
- Nickname: Hanko Battalion
- Engagements: Continuation War: Battle of Hanko

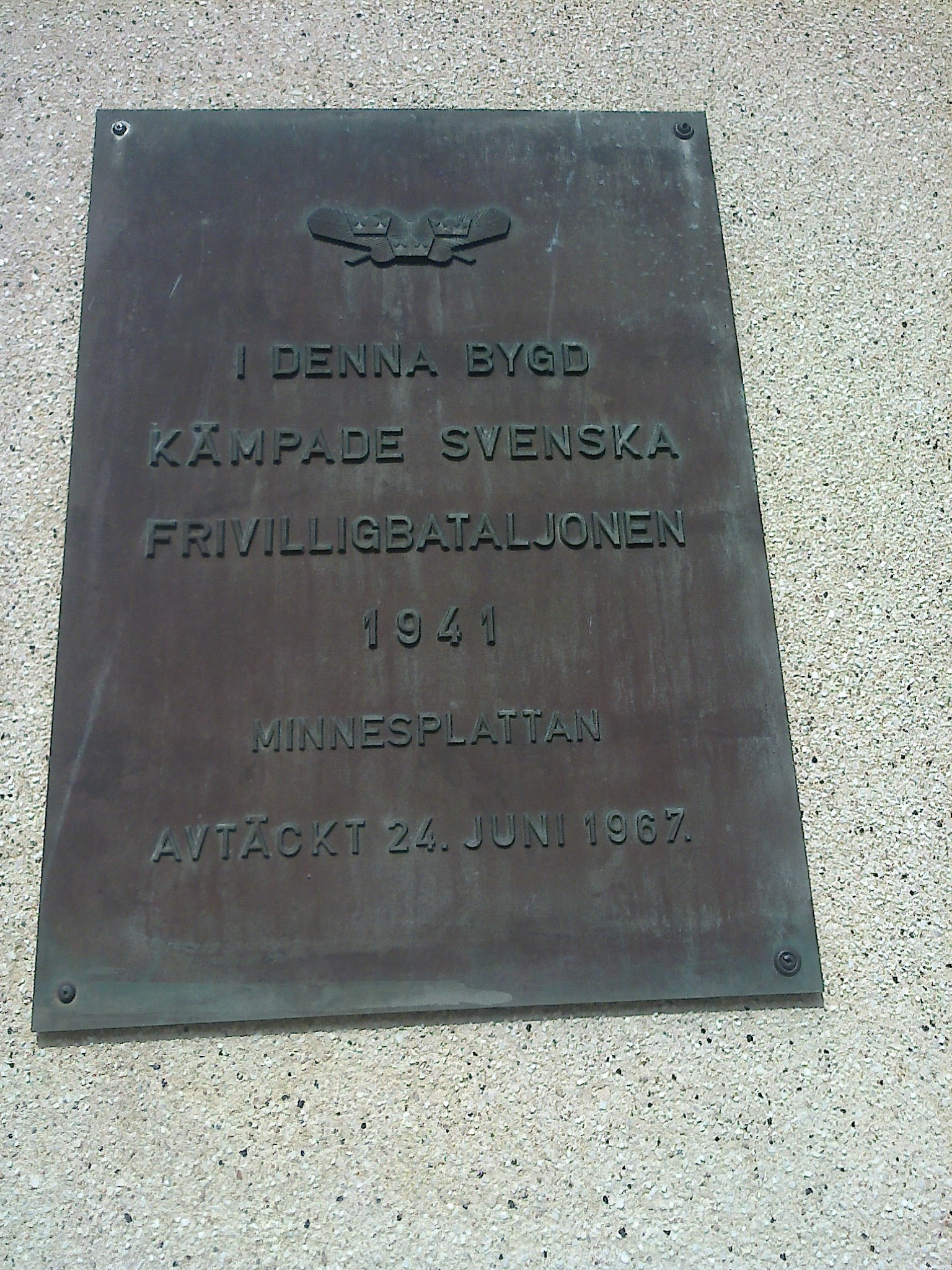
A plaque at the Hanko town hall commemorating the Swedish Volunteer Battalion.

The Swedish Volunteer Battalion (Swedish: Svenska frivilligbataljonen, SFB) or the Hanko Battalion was a Swedish military unit consisting of 1,000 volunteers, including 800 Swedes, which participated in the siege of the Soviet naval fleet in the Battle of Hanko during the Continuation War of Finland. The Volunteer Battalion succeeded the Swedish Volunteer Corps and preceded the Swedish Volunteer Company in World War II.

== History ==
The Swedish Volunteer Battalion was officially formed on 10 August 1941. One third of the Battalion's members had participated in the Winter War. The Battalion participated in the Battle of Hanko where 25 members of the battalion were killed and 75 were wounded.

== See also ==
- Swedish Volunteer Corps
- Swedish Voluntary Air Force
- Swedish Volunteer Company
