= Flying Regiment 19, Finnish Air Force =

Flight Regiment 19 (F 19)
- Lentorykmentti 19 (Finnish); 19. flygflottiljen (Swedish)
- Roundel of the Finnish Air Force
- Active: 10 January 1940 - 13 March 1940
- Countries: Finland
- Branch: Finnish Air Force
- Role: Fighter and bomber
- Garrison/HQ: Veitsiluoto, Kemi
- Anniversaries: 12 January
- Engagements: Winter War

Commanders
- Notable commanders: Hugo Beckhammar

Aircraft flown
- Bomber: B 4
- Fighter: J 8
- Transport: Tp 1, Tp 8

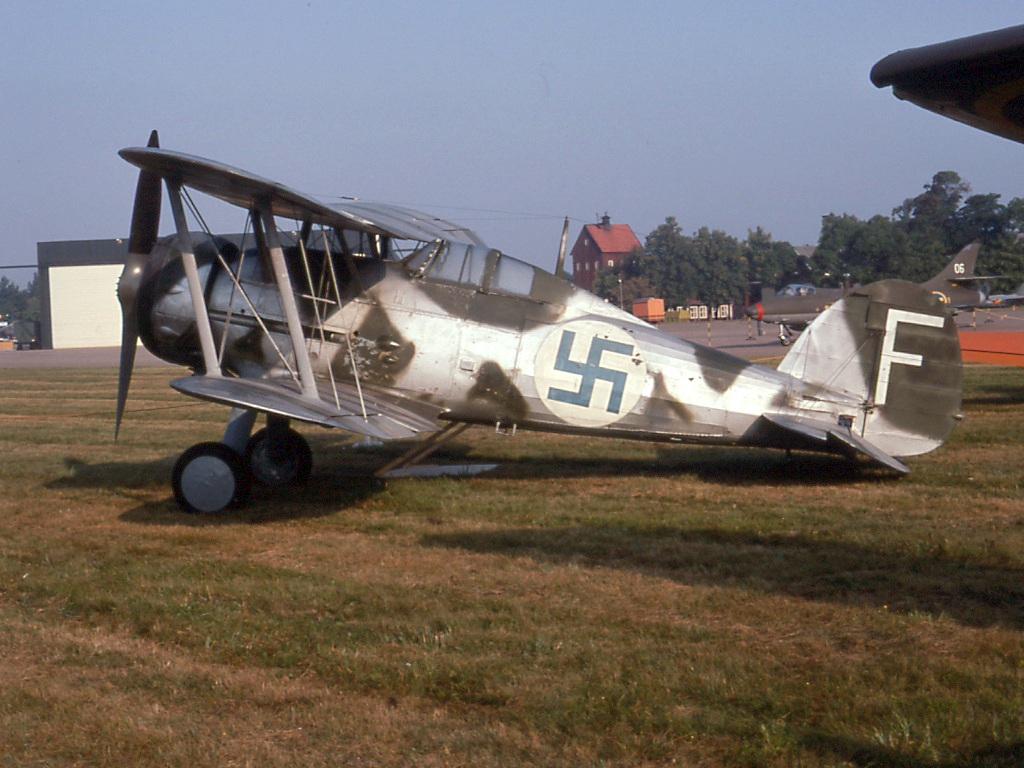
A J 8 at F 3 Malmslätt in 1976.

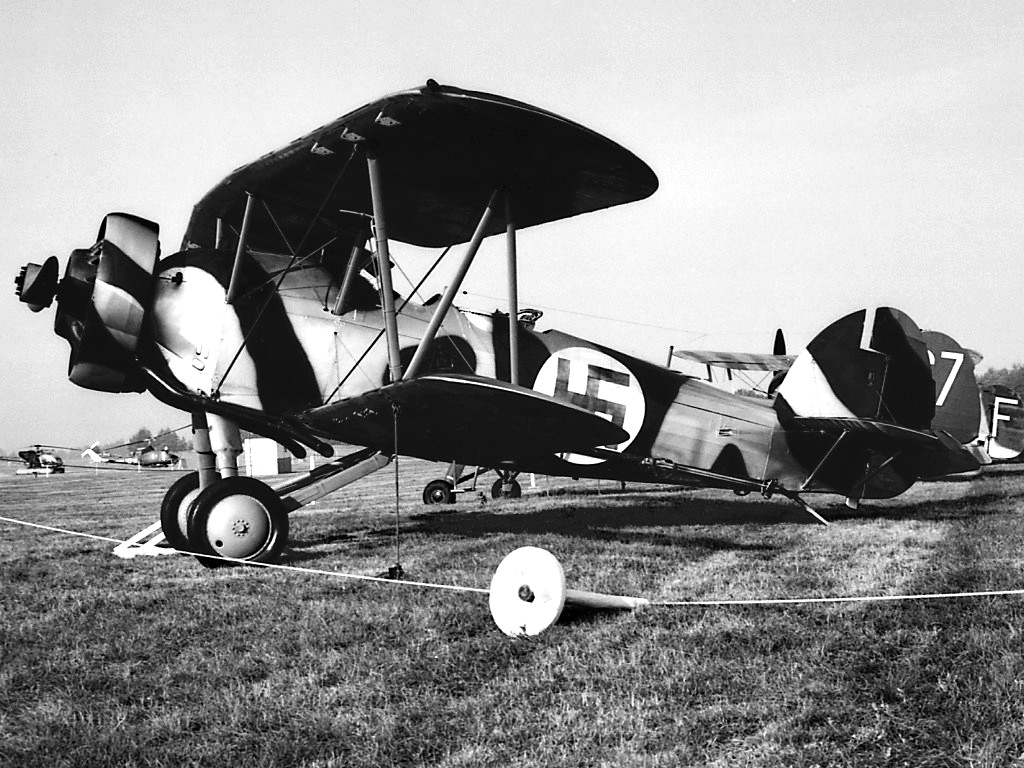
A B 4 at F 3 Malmslätt in 1976.

Flight Regiment 19 (Swedish: Flygflottilj 19, Finnish: Lentorykmentti 19 or LentoR 19), known in Sweden as the Swedish Volunteer Air Wing in Finland (Svenska frivilligflottiljen i Finland) or F 19 Finland was a Finnish Air Force unit, manned by Swedish volunteers, which operated from Kemi in northern Finland for the last 62 days of the Winter War, and equipped with aircraft from the inventory of the Swedish Air Force. Its designation number was taken from the Swedish Air Force, which had 18 Air Force Wings at the time. The designation F 19 has not been used in Sweden. When new Wings were later formed, they were named F 20, F 21 and F 22.

The unit made a significant contribution to the defense of Finnish Lapland, from January 7, 1940, with 12 Gloster Gladiator Mk. II (J 8A) fighters, five Hawker Hart (B 4) bombers, and eight other planes. In total, the unit destroyed twelve Soviet aircraft (eight in the air, four on the ground), and lost a total of six planes; two to enemy action and four to accidents. Three of its pilots were killed and two more were captured by Soviet forces. The captives were returned to Sweden five months after the end of the war.

== Organization ==
- Staff
  - Staff Detachment
  - Radio Detachment
  - Household Detachment
  - Truck Detachment
  - Medical Detachment
- Airfield Company
- Fighter Squadron, equipped with Gloster Gladiator Mk. I Biplanes, designated J 8 in Swedish service
- Bomber/Attack Flight, equipped with Hawker Hart light bombers, designated B 4 in Swedish service
- Transport/Liaison Flight, various aircraft types

The unit was equipped with 12 Gloster Gladiator Mk. Is, four Hawker Hart Mk. Is, one Raab-Katzenstein RK-26, one Waco ZQC-6, and one Junkers F 13kä.

== Victories ==
Victories claimed while flying Gloster Gladiator
Name	Air force	Victories	Notes
Per-Johan Salwén	Finnish Air Force	3	F 19
Einar Theler	Finnish Air Force	2	F 19
Ian Iacobi	Finnish Air Force	1	F 19
Gideon Karlsson	Finnish Air Force	1	F 19
Roland Martin	Finnish Air Force	1	F 19

The F 19 unit destroyed 12 enemy aircraft, and lost three Hawker Harts and three Gloster Gladiators due to various incidents, however, only one of these, a Gladiator, was lost in an air battle.
