= Foreign support of Finland in the Winter War =

Foreign support in the Winter War consisted of materiel, men and moral support to the Finnish struggle against the Soviet Union in the Winter War. World opinion at large supported the Finnish cause. The Second World War had not yet begun in earnest and was known to the public as the Phoney War; at that time, the Winter War saw the only real fighting in Europe besides the German and Soviet invasion of Poland, and thus held major world interest. The Soviet aggression was generally deemed unjustified. Various foreign organizations sent material aid, such as medical supplies. Finnish immigrants in the United States and Canada returned home, and many volunteers (one of them future actor Christopher Lee) traveled to Finland to join Finland's forces: 8,700 Swedes, 1,010 Danes (including Christian Frederik von Schalburg, a captain in the Danish Royal Life Guards and later commander of the Free Corps Denmark, a volunteer unit created by Nazi Germany in Denmark during World War II), about 1,000 Estonians, 725 Norwegians, 372 Ingrians, 366 Hungarians, 346 Finnish expatriates, 4 Latvians, 2 Lithuanians and 190 volunteers of other nationalities made it to Finland before the war was over. 100 Greek volunteers also volunteered, but did not reach Finland in time.

Pope Pius XII condemned the Soviet attack on 26 December 1939 in a speech at the Vatican and later donated a signed and sealed prayer on behalf of Finland.

== Belgium ==
There was widespread popular support for Finland in Belgium which, at the time, was a neutral state under the "policy of independence". 52 Belgians served as volunteers in the Finnish army.

== Canada ==
250 Canadians of Finnish descent volunteered to fight for Finland. They fought as part of the Finnish American Legion. Initially the Canadian Foreign Enlistment Act was a hindrance for Canadian citizens who also wished to volunteer. However on 1 March 1940, Canada announced that its citizens were free to enlist in the Finnish Armed Forces. An additional 2,000 Canadians volunteered to fight for Finland as part of a unit known as "Finland’s Little Army".

== Denmark ==
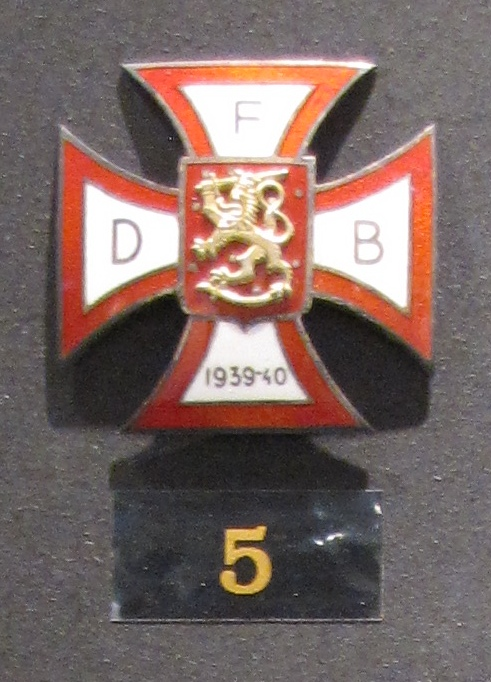
Insignia of Danish Winter War volunteers (1939-40)

1,010 Danes volunteered to fight for Finland. Most were stationed in Oulu and never saw combat. An exception were Danish pilots that were stationed at various air bases. Among these were two marine pilots that deserted to join Finland, one of which was killed after having shot down four Soviet planes. A total of 4 Danes were killed - 3 of them pilots.

== Estonia ==
Estonia remained officially neutral, but 400–1000 Estonian individuals travelled clandestinely to Finland and volunteered to fight against the Soviet invaders. It is estimated that around 100 Estonian volunteers on the Finnish side saw military action before the end of the Winter War. First Estonian citizens, who joined the Winter War were the Ingrian Finns living in the eastern part of Estonia. Johannes Valtonen, who died on the 9th of February is considered to be the first Estonian citizen to die in World War II.

== Greece ==
The war aroused great interest in Greece; a popular movement emerged to help Finland, considering it to be the 'heroic nation of the North'. In Greek press, the war was depicted as a battle of David against Goliath and Finland was depicted extremely positively throughout.

Although the Greek government took a neutral stance in the war, it tacitly approved aid activities for Finland. They were carried out under the Hellenic Athletics Federation and thousands of people signed up for donations. Over 50,000€ were collected in the first fundraising campaign; the Finnish Red Cross also received loads of donations.

In addition to money, material goods were also donated. Two million cigarettes, wine, figs, raisins and 1,200 boxes of oranges were sent to Finland. The Finnish Consulate General's annual report in 1940 stated how "despite the economic depression, widespread unemployment, and difficult conditions, people responded to the appeals for donations and willingly contributed their share for the good of Finland".

In addition, about 100 Greek volunteers registered with the Finnish Consulate General in Piraeus to fight on Finland's side, but the Greek government considered their deployment undesirable because of fears of Soviet reprisals against the large Greek minority in the Soviet Union. Nevertheless, most of them still sought to go despite their government's position. Several Greek pilots were ready to depart when the Moscow Peace Treaty was announced on 12 March 1940, bringing the Winter War to an end before they could reach Finland.

== Hungary ==
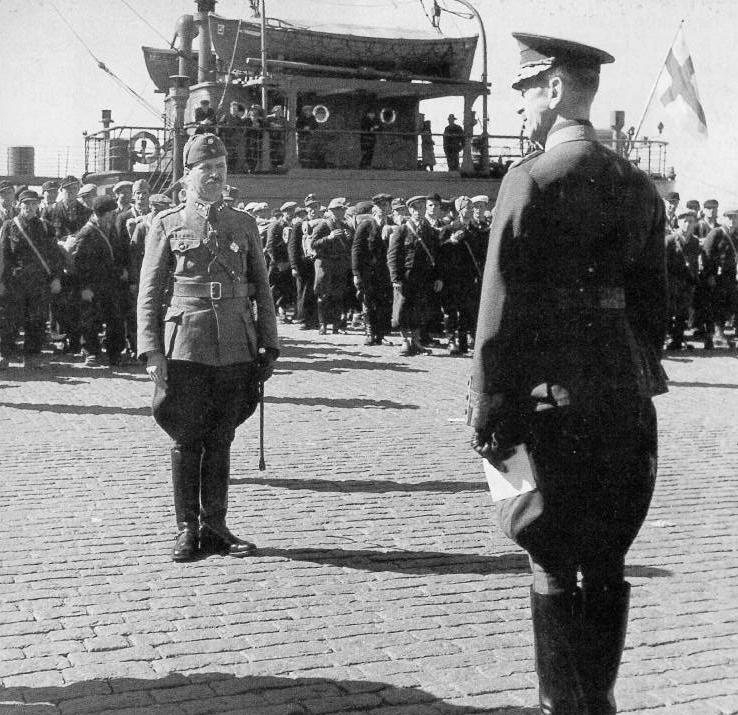
Hungarian volunteers leaving from Finland after the Winter War.

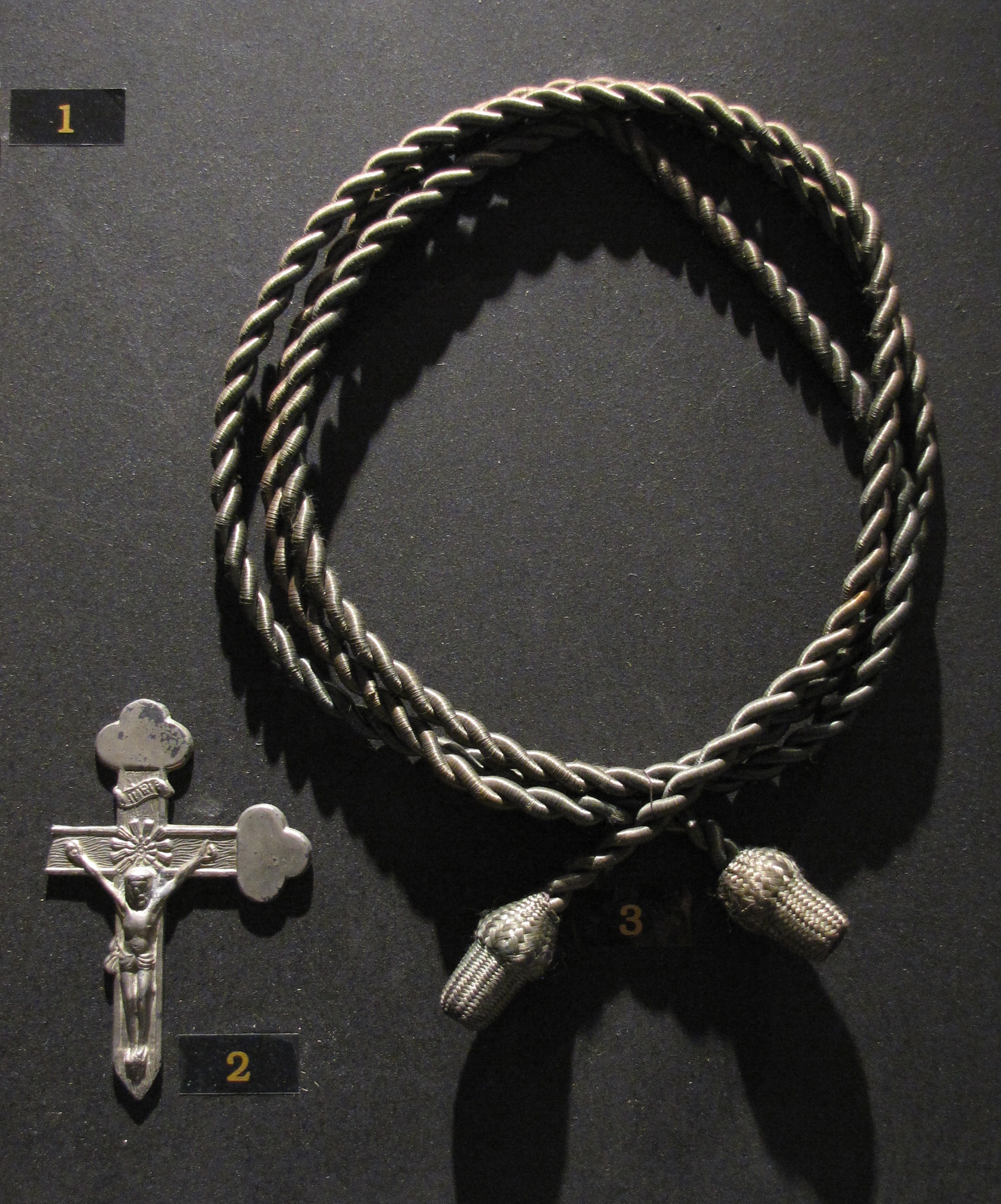
Crucifix struck by bullet of a Hungarian Winter War volunteer and the aiguillette of a Hungarian engineering squad leader

The Hungarian government officially did not support Finland, but secretly started to search for ways to help. In addition, non-governmental organisations began to organize support for Finland. Hungary helped Finland by giving monetary donations, armaments and military volunteers. Nobel Prize winner Albert Szent-Györgyi offered all of his prize money to Finland.

Count Pál Teleki's government sent armaments and war equipment valued at 1 million Hungarian pengős during the Winter War (with knowledge and accord of Regent Miklós Horthy de Nagybánya). The recruiting of volunteers started on 16 December. During the Winter War, around 25,000 Hungarian men applied to fight in Finland; finally, 350 applications were accepted. Their military training started at 10 January and it took almost a month. The volunteers formed a battalion what was commanded by Lieutenant Imre Kémeri Nagy. The Hungarian Volunteer Detached Battalion had 24 officers, 52 non-commissioned officers, 2 physicians and 2 military chaplains for a total of 346 officers and men.

Travel to Finland was very difficult as the German Reich forbade transit of armaments and war equipment across its territory (including the occupied Polish territories). Therefore, volunteers had to travel across Yugoslavia, Italy, France, the United Kingdom, Norway and Sweden to make their ways to Finland. They travelled without any weapons by a special train, officially classified as "tourists going to ski-camp". Finally the battalion arrived in Finland at 2 March after 3 weeks travelling.

In Finland the battalion was quartered in Lapua, in the training center of the international volunteers. In Lapua they took a part in further military training, learning skiing and winter warfare. Before the Hungarian battalion could see military action, the Moscow Peace Treaty was signed, on 12 March in Moscow, leaving many volunteers frustrated.

In the last days of March, Field Marshal Mannerheim visited Lapua where he met the Hungarian battalion. He expressed his thanks to the volunteers for coming to Finland and he promoted Lieutenant Imre Kémeri Nagy to Captain. From 17 April to 19 May, the Hungarian battalion served in Karelia, at the new state border in Lappeenranta.

The Hungarian battalion was embarked at Turku at 20 May 1940, from where a steamboat sailed to Stettin, German Reich (now Szczecin, in Poland). They traveled across the German Reich by a special train with a German guard. The volunteers arrived at Budapest on 28 May.

Besides the Hungarian Volunteer Detached Battalion, other Hungarian volunteers fought in the Winter War in the Finnish army, travelling to Finland individually. 2nd Lieutenant Mátyás Pirityi served in the Finnish Air Force and took part in more than 20 sorties. Warrant Officer Vilmos Békássy's plane disappeared over the Gulf of Bothnia. Géza Szepessy, along with four fellows from the Military Technical College of Berlin, went to Finland where he was wounded in action.

== Italy ==
In violation of the Italo-Soviet Pact, Fascist Italy had staunchly supported Francisco Franco during the Spanish Civil War in his fight against the Second Spanish Republic, which was supported by the Soviet Union in a proxy war. Italy violated the pact for the second time by promptly responding to requests by the Republic of Finland for military assistance and equipment for use against the Soviet government. The Royal Italian Air Force (Regia Aeronautica Italiana) sent thirty-five Fiat G.50 fighters, while the Royal Italian Army (Regio Esercito Italiano) supplied 94,500 new M1938 7.35 mm rifles for use by Finnish infantry. However, the Soviet Union's new partner Germany intercepted much of Italy's aid. 32 planes still made it to Finland, mostly via sea, before the war was over.

A handful of Italian volunteers also fought in the Winter War on the side of Finland.

== Norway ==
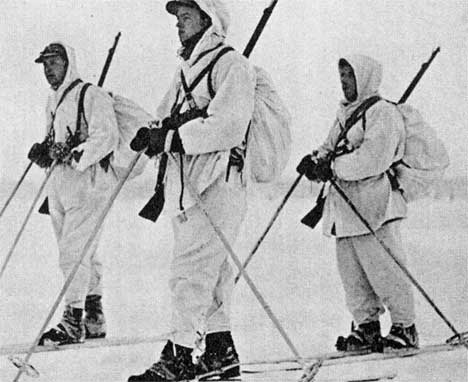
Norwegian volunteers in Northern Finland, 1940

The Norwegian government prohibited officers or under-officers to volunteer for the war in Finland out of fear that this would aggravate the Germans (they wanted to remain neutral at all costs). Of the 725 Norwegians that volunteered to fight for Finland, only 125 made it to the relatively tranquil Salla front and then just three weeks before the war ended. Several of the future leaders of the Norwegian resistance movement such as Max Manus and Leif "Shetland" Larsen were among the volunteers. The most highly decorated Norwegian in the later resistance movement, Gunnar Sønsteby, spent his stay as an office clerk (like many of his countrymen in the Winter War).

In addition to the military volunteers, 30 physicians and 40 nurses went to help the Finnish medical system, under the auspices of the Norwegian People's Aid.

There were numerous nationwide collection campaigns of supplies and money in Norway to help the Finns. In all, the Finland collection (Norwegian: Finlandsinnsamlingen) brought in some 2,000,000 kr, the largest popular collection in Norwegian history. Six training aircraft were purchased for part of these funds. Initial flying training was given, close to Oslo, with these aircraft to students sent from Finland.

An important venue for collections for Finland were sporting events, several of which were held for the benefit of Finland in Norway during the war. Some 50,000 backpacks filled with supplies were collected in Norway and dispatched to Finland. Collections of rifles (mostly Krag–Jørgensen models) and home knitted shooting gloves also took place. Sigrid Undset, Norwegian author and Nobel laureate, donated her Nobel medal to Finland on 25 January 1940.

The Norwegian government secretly donated to the Finns 12 German-made 7.5 cm field gun m/01s (designated 75 K 01 in Finnish service) in February 1940. Included in the covert artillery transfer were 12,000 shells. Norway also allowed the transfer of aircraft to Finland via Sola Air Station, near Stavanger. Norwegian volunteers took part in the assembly of some of the aircraft at the Saab factory in Trollhättan, Sweden.

One of the main reasons that the Franco-British plan—Operation Avon Head—to send troops to Finland never materialized was that Norway would not allow them to use their ports and territory for troops transfer in order to preserve a policy of neutrality. They explicitly threatened to fire upon any ship that came near Trondheim or Narvik on that mission, as it was correctly assumed that such a force would in reality be used to occupy those towns.

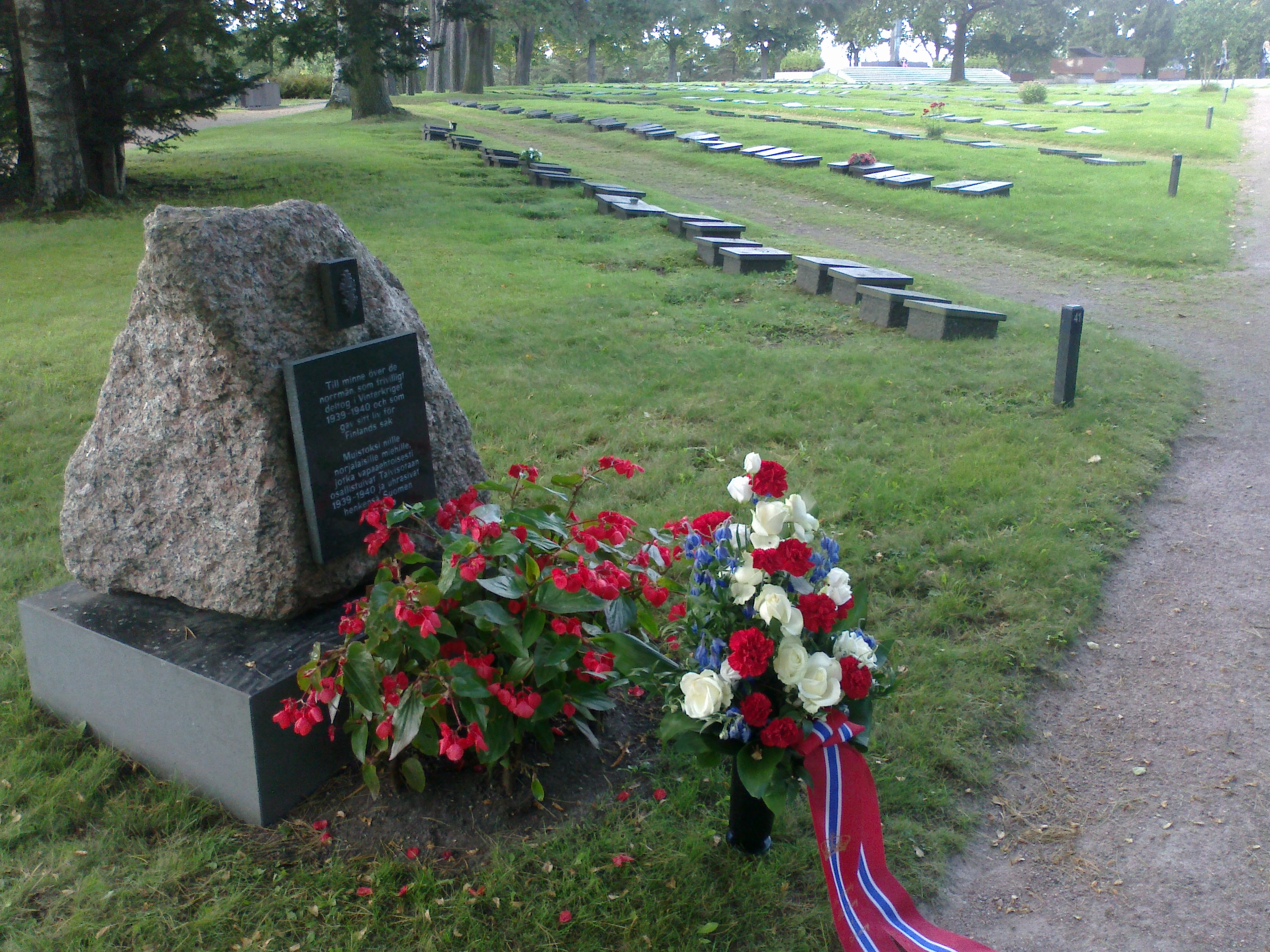
Memorial monument in honour of Norwegian volunteers who lost their lives in the Winter War between the Soviet Union and Finland in 1939-1940

The North Norwegian county of Finnmark received over 1,000 Finnish refugees from Petsamo by 6 February 1940; as the Red Army advanced through that lightly defended area Finnish civilians sought shelter on the Norwegian side of the Pasvik/Paatsjoki River. By the end of the war, some 1,600 Finnish civilians had fled to Norway. Finnish soldiers of the independent Lapland Group that retreated across the border into Finnmark were transported south and interned at Hegra Fortress in the Nord-Trøndelag county of Central Norway. The internees were released and returned to Finland at the turn of the year 1939–1940. As the Finns had retreated in the northern areas, they had carried out a scorched earth policy, destroying all housing and infrastructure to impede the Soviet advance.

After the end of the war, Norwegian aid continued, shifting to reconstruction aid. When Norway was itself invaded by the Germans on 9 April 1940, the Finnish government immediately announced that the remaining money set off for Norwegian aid work in Finland could be diverted to use in Norway.

== Poland ==
Poland's Prime Minister Władysław Sikorski, despite the ongoing occupation of Poland (since September 1939), had promised to send support in the form of the Polish Independent Highland Brigade to help the Finns in fighting. The help was organised late, however, and never reached Finland. Nevertheless, six volunteers from Poland fought with the Finns during the war.

== Sweden ==
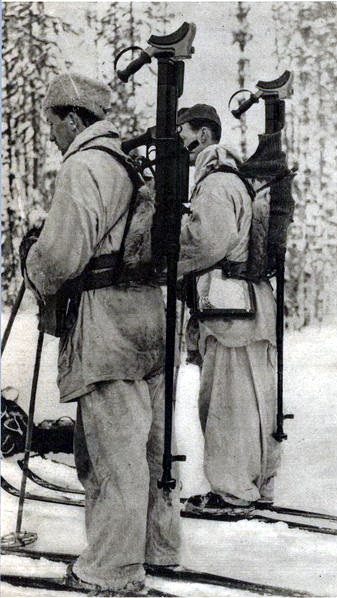
Swedish volunteers during the Winter War, carrying Boys anti-tank rifles on their backs.

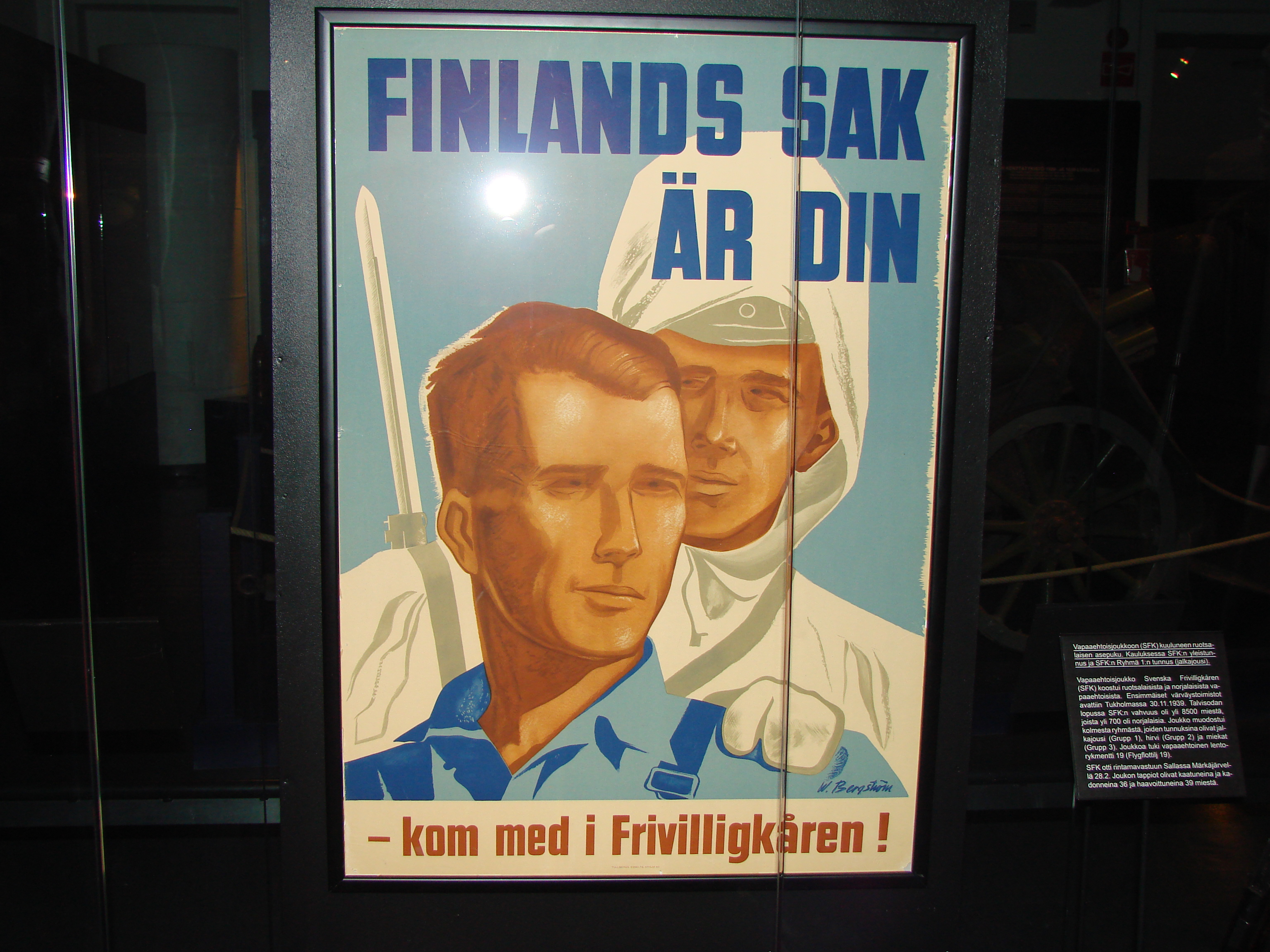
Swedish Volunteer Corps recruitment poster

Sweden, which had declared itself to be a non-belligerent rather than a neutral country (unlike for the rest of World War II wherein Sweden tried to uphold neutrality), contributed military supplies, cash, credits, humanitarian aid and some 8,700 Swedish volunteers prepared to fight for Finland. The Swedish Army, which had been downsizing its armed forces since the 1920s, transferred approximately 1/3 of its equipment to Finland, among them 135,000 rifles and 330 guns and large quantities of ammunition.

A small number of aeroplanes was given to Swedish Voluntary Air Force, in action from 7 January, with 12 Gloster Gladiator II fighters, five Hawker Hart bombers, and eight other planes, amounting to one third of all the Swedish Air Force's fighters at that time. Volunteer pilots and mechanics were drawn from the ranks. The renowned aviator Count Carl Gustaf von Rosen, nephew of Carin Göring, Hermann Göring's first wife, volunteered independently. There was also a volunteer work force of about 900 workers and engineers. In March, the unit was to be reinforced with five Junkers Ju 86 bombers; on 11 March, the bombers were in the Swedish town of Boden with all preparations completed but the end of hostilities on the 13th precluded their deployment.

The Swedish Volunteer Corps, with 8,402 men in Finland—the only common volunteers who had finished training before the war ended—began relieving five Finnish battalions at Märkäjärvi in mid-February. Together with three remaining Finnish battalions, the corps faced two Soviet divisions and were preparing for an attack by mid-March but were inhibited by the peace agreement. Thirty-three men were killed in action, among them the commander of the first relieving unit, Lieutenant Colonel Magnus Dyrssen.

The Swedish volunteers remain a source of dissonance between Swedes and Finns. The domestic debate in Finland had in the years immediately before the war given common Finns hope of considerably more support from Sweden, such as a large force of regular troops, that could have had a significant impact on the outcome of the war—or possibly caused the Soviets not to attack at all. However, the help from volunteers, especially the Scandinavian ones, was appreciated by the Finns. This is shown by the fact that during the Norwegian campaign against the German invasion in April 1940, a Finnish group of volunteers formed an ambulance unit and helped the defenders until forced to return home because of the success of the German armed forces. A group of Swedish and Finnish volunteers also fought alongside Norwegian soldiers against the German invaders near Os, on 2 May as well.

From the Swedish government’s perspective, the voluntary battalions represented a convenient measure, not only to „canalize“ so-called „activist“ forces within the population, but also to deflect criticism that Sweden was not doing anything to help their neighbouring country. Many Swedish government officials, however, feared that, within the dynamics of the war, the voluntary movement could evolve into a regular military intervention, thereby inevitably dragging Sweden into the conflict. These concerns might have influenced the Swedish government’s initial reluctance to wholeheartedly approve of the volunteers' intentions. Sweden's role seemed to be rather passive overall. Defense Minister Per Edvin Sköld e.g. ruled out that Sweden would train or equip the volunteers, fearing that this step could be perceived as co-belligerence by the Soviets.

== France and United Kingdom ==
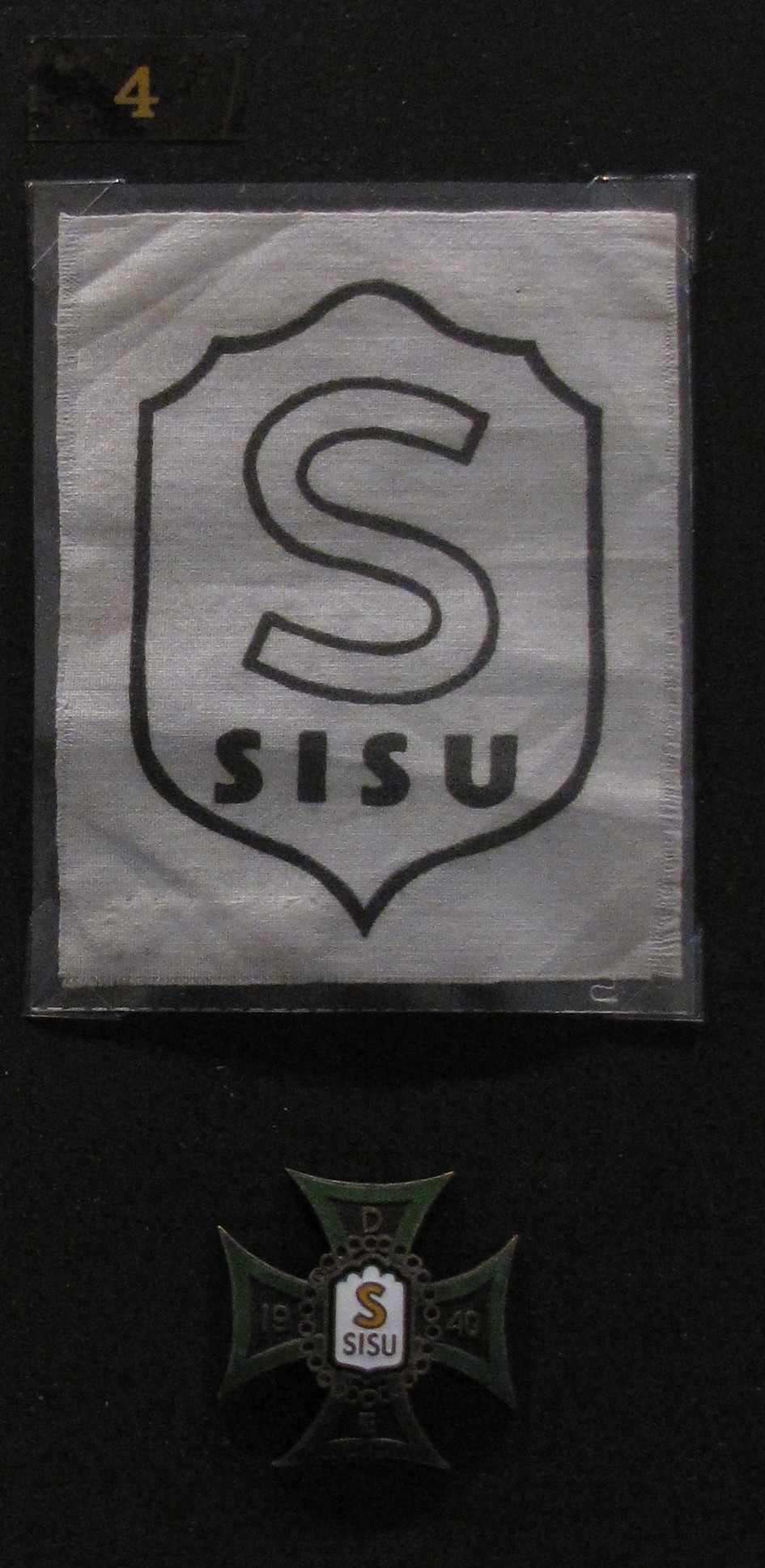
Shoulder patch and insignia of British Sisu Winter War volunteer unit.

The British government sold the Finnish air force 30 Bristol Blenheim bombers and Gloster Gladiator fighters. U.S.-made Brewster B239 fighters came too late to participate in combat missions, and the same applied to ten Hawker Hurricane I fighters. The British government also provided small arms and ammunition, including a large number of Boys anti-tank rifles in 1939 and 1940.

In the United Kingdom, the "Finland Aid Bureau" and the politician Leo Amery sought to raise a contingent of volunteers to fight on the Finnish side despite the fact that the country was already at war with Germany at the time. 500 volunteers were found for a "British Volunteer Contingent" which was to be commanded by the American officer Kermit Roosevelt. The first volunteers arrived in Finland in March 1940.

France also sent aircraft, including the Morane Saulnier M.S.406 fighter. In 1940, it was decided to send a new fighter, the Caudron–Renault C.714. Six C.714s previously marked for shipment to the Polish Air Force were placed in containers and diverted to Le Havre harbour for shipment to Finland. On 12 March 1940, the first six aircraft were already on their way to Finland when news of the armistice between Finland and the Soviet Union was received. At the time deliveries were halted, ten aircraft were in containers at Le Havre waiting to be lifted to the ships and three more were on their way from Paris. The French Army also supplied small arms and ammunition, mostly of obsolete design.

=== Franco-British plans for intervention ===
Within a month, the Soviet leadership began to consider abandoning the operation, and on 29 January 1940, via intermediaries in Sweden, Finland's government was approached on the subject of preliminary peace negotiations. Until this point, Finland had fought for its existence as an independent and democratic country. However, at the news that Finland might be forced to cede its territory or sovereignty, public opinion in France and Britain, already favorable to Finland, swung in favor of intervention. When rumors of an armistice reached governments in Paris and London, both decided to offer military support. Although already at war with Nazi Germany, Britain and France put together a combined force of 100 000 troops and 62 bomber aircraft to go to Finland's aid. However this plan was thwarted on 5 March when Sweden refused passage. On 6 March, President Kallio of Finland authorised a Finnish peace delegation.

== United States ==
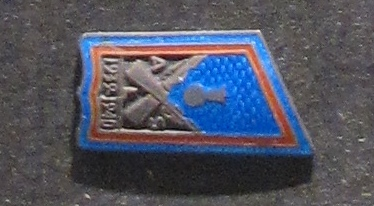
Insignia of Winter War volunteer unit Finnish American Legion

The Soviet attack was condemned by some Americans, with some businesses refusing to sell supplies to the Soviet Union. Responding to a call from a manufacturer who refused to sell to the aggressor, the American-Russian Chamber of Commerce compared his objections to "[refusing] to sell to a man because he beats his wife".

In December 1939, Americans sympathetic to Finnish claims led by former President Herbert Hoover (who had previously formed the Commission for Polish Relief and, in World War I, headed the Commission for Relief in Belgium) formed the Finnish Relief Fund to donate money to aid Finnish civilians and refugees. By the end of January, it had already sent more than two million dollars to the Finns.

As late as 1939, it seemed highly improbable that the United States and the Soviet Union would forge an alliance. U.S.-Soviet relations had soured significantly following Stalin's decision to sign a non-aggression pact with Nazi Germany in August 1939.

Following the Soviet occupation of Eastern Poland in September 1939 and the Winter War in November, President Franklin Delano Roosevelt publicly condemned the Soviet Union as a dictatorship and to impose a "moral embargo" on the export of certain products to the Soviet Union. Soviet propaganda also claimed that after the Winter War, sanctions were imposed on frozen funds, which were then lifted later, due to Germany's invasion of the USSR on June 22, 1941.

== Uruguay ==
Following the outbreak of World War II, Uruguayan President Alfredo Baldomir Ferrari declared the country's neutrality. However, in the first months of the war a shift towards the Allied side was noted, evidenced in the events of the Battle of the River Plate, the first naval battle of the war and the only direct war confrontation in South America. After the Soviet invasion of Finland and the start of the Winter War, the General Assembly of Uruguay passed Law No. 9914 ―based on a bill presented by President Baldomir and Ministers César Charlone and Alberto Guani―, which provided for the donation of 100,000 Uruguayan pesos to Finland, and established the Friends of Finland Commission in charge of collecting money.

On the other hand, the La Mañana and El Diario newspapers collected money with which they bought and sent to the front 10,563 350-gram cans of corned beef manufactured by Frigorífico Anglo del Uruguay. Each can had a legend in Finnish: "Uruguayn kansa Suomen sankarilliselle armeijalle", translated into English as: "from the Uruguayan people to the heroic army of Finland".

== See also ==
- Operation Pike

== Bibliography ==
- Andersson, Lennart B3 Junkers Ju86 i Sverige
- Cox, Geoffrey (1941) The Red Army Moves (Victor Gollancz, London).
- Engle, Eloise & Paananen, Lauri (1992). The Winter War: The Soviet Attack on Finland 1939–1940. Stackpole Books. ISBN 0-8117-2433-6.
- Jakobson, Max (1961). The Diplomacy of the Winter War: An Account of the Russo-Finnish War, 1939–1940. Cambridge, Massachusetts: Harvard University Press.
- Öhquist, Harald (1949). Talvisota minun näkökulmastani. Helsinki: WSOY. (in Finnish)
- Ries, Tomas (1988). Cold Will: Defence of Finland. Brassey's. ISBN 0-08-033592-6.
- Schwartz, Andrew J. (1960). America and the Russo-Finnish War. Washington, D.C.: Public Affairs Press.
- Tanner, Väinö (1957) The Winter War: Finland against Russia 1939–1940 Stanford University Press, California; also London.
- Trotter, William R. (2002) [First published 1991 in the United States under the title A Frozen Hell: The Russo–Finnish Winter War of 1939–40]. The Winter war: The Russo–Finno War of 1939–40 (5th ed.). New York (Great Britain: London): Workman Publishing Company (Great Britain: Aurum Press). ISBN 1-85410-881-6.
- Upton, Anthony F. (1974). Finland 1939–1940 (University of Delaware Press, Newark: part of series The Politics and Strategy of the Second World War) ISBN 0-87413-156-1
- Van Dyke, Carl (1997). The Soviet Invasion of Finland, 1939–40. Frank Cass Publishers. ISBN 0-7146-4314-9.
- Vehviläinen, Olli (2002). Finland in the Second World War: Between Germany and Russia. New York: Palgrave. ISBN 0-333-80149-0.
- "Finland i Krig 1939–1940" – multiple authors. ISBN 951-50-1182-5
- Ruprecht, Antal (2003). Magyar önkéntesek a Téli háborúban [Hungarian volunteers in the Winter War]. Hadtörténeti Intézet és Múzeum, Budapest (text in Hungarian and Finnish).
