= Hoover Commission in Poland =

Hoover Commission in Poland may refer to:

- American Relief Administration after World War I
- Commission for Polish Relief after World War II
