= Finnish American Legion =

- Amerikan Suomalainen Legioona
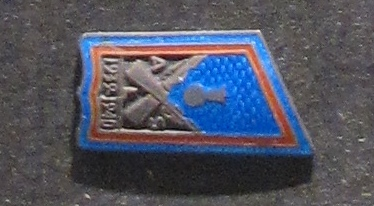
- Badge
- Active: 9 December 1939 – 27 June 1940
- Allegiance: Finland
- Type: Foreign volunteer
- Size: 378 men
- Engagements: Winter War

Commanders
- Notable commanders: Captain Albert Penttilä

The Finnish American Legion (Finnish: Amerikan Suomalainen Legioona) was a foreign volunteer unit that volunteered to fight for Finland during the Winter War. It included volunteers from the United States, Canada, the United Kingdom, and the Netherlands.

== History ==
On 9 December 1939, 54 men and five women traveled from New York to Finland as volunteers for the Winter War. They arrived in Tornio on 24 December 1939. The volunteers were under the command of Lieutenant Albert Penttilä, who would later be promoted to the rank of Captain. During the war, 250 volunteers from Canada also joined them.

On 22 February 1940, the unit was officially designated as the "Finnish American Legion".
