= Hungarian volunteers in the Winter War =

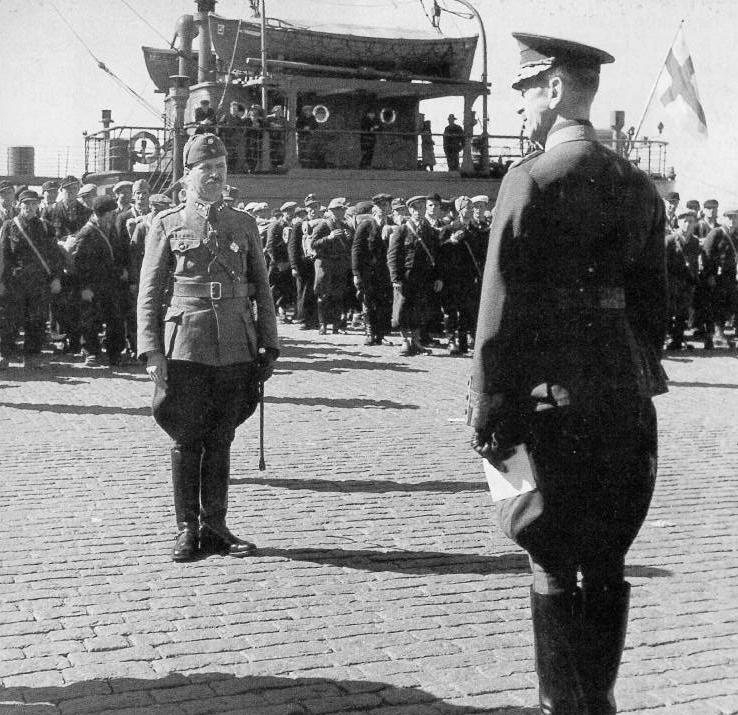
Hungarian volunteers leaving Finland after the Winter War. The group was led by Captain Imre Kémeri Nagy. Seeing him off was Lieutenant General Oscar Enckell.

The Hungarian Volunteers in the Winter War travelled to fight for the Finns after the Soviet invasion of Finland in 1939. For a variety of reasons, volunteers from the Kingdom of Hungary fought on the side of Finland during the Winter War (1939–1940) against the Soviet Union.

== Hungarian-Finnish relationship before and after World War I ==
At the end of the 19th century the Finno-Ugric linguistic affinity became widely accepted after extensive public debate. Some Magyar scientists (e.g. orientalist Ármin Vámbéry) and intellectuals (e.g. Arany János and Jókai Mór) were unable to accept that the Hungarian nation had family relations in Northern Europe. To them, relationships with the Hun or Turkic peoples seemed much more plausible, mainly in the years of the Hungarian millennium around 1896. At this time the Finnish people, living in Tsarist Russia, were receptive to the idea of Finno-Ugric affinity and regarded the proud and freedom-loving Hungarian nation as an ideal.

After the First World War, Finland became independent, but Hungary lost the war and roughly two-thirds of its territory as a result of the Treaty of Trianon. One-third of Hungarians were suddenly left outside Hungary's borders, as it became increasingly isolated. Finland was one of the few European countries that felt sympathy towards Hungary. Hungarians in turn, then regarded newly independent and democratic Finland as an ideal. Because of this, good connections formed between the two countries during the 1920s.

When the Winter War broke out between Finland and the Soviet Union, many Hungarians felt great sympathy towards the Finns and wanted to help them.

== Hungarian support to Finland ==
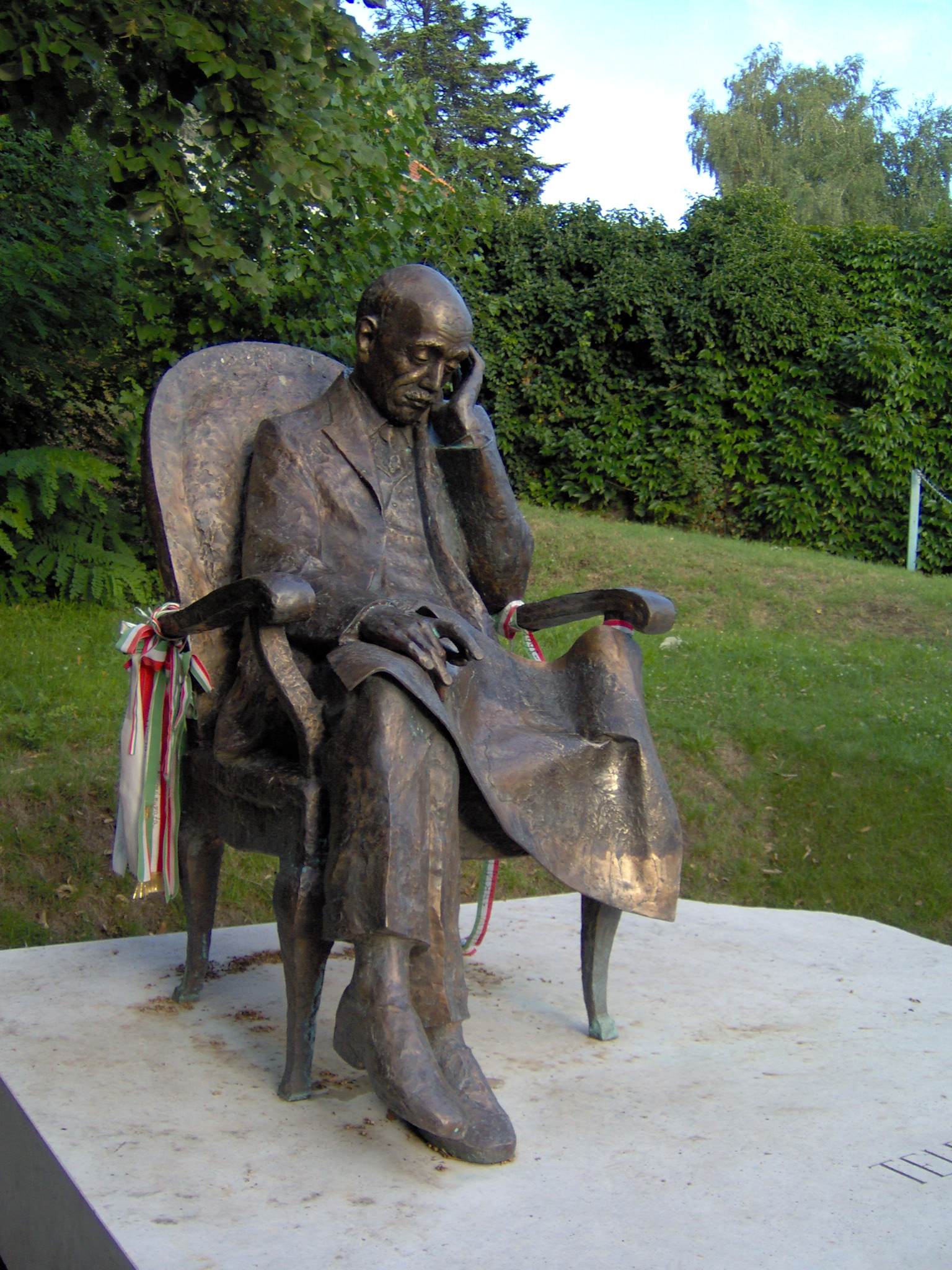
Statue of Count Pál Teleki, who organized the Hungarian support of Finland during the Winter War, in Balatonboglár, Hungary.

The Hungarian government officially did not support Finland, but secretly started searching for ways of helping. In addition, non-governmental organisations began to organize support for Finland. Hungary helped Finland by giving monetary donations, armaments and military volunteers.

The Hungarian-Finnish Association began to organize nationwide collections in the first days of December as “Brother for brother” and “Hungarian Mothers for Finnish Children”. Collecting of donations and clothes was organised by the Hungarian Red Cross, which also organized the shipment of this aid to Finland. Nobel Prize winner Albert Szent-Györgyi offered all of his prize money to Finland.

Count Pál Teleki’s government sent armaments and war equipment valued at 1 million Hungarian pengős by British and Italian ships during the Winter War (with knowledge and accord of Regent Miklós Horthy de Nagybánya). It contained 36 anti-aircraft guns with 10,250 cartridges, 16 mortars with 32,240 shells, 300 rifles with 520,000 cartridges, 30 armor-piercing rifles with 3,300 cartridges (taken from the Polish army), 300,000 hand grenades, 3,654 land mines, 93,680 helmets, 223 military transceivers, and 26,000 bandoleers.

The recruiting of volunteers started on 16 December with the printing of recruitment leaflets. The acts of Teleki’s government were motivated on one hand by helping a related nation, and on the other hand by the staunch anti-communist and anti-Soviet attitude of the Hungarian elite.

== Hungarian Volunteer Detached Battalion ==
=== The volunteers ===
During the Winter War, around 25,000 Hungarian men applied to fight in Finland. The applicants underwent a strenuous selection process: the only applications accepted were from unmarried men who had already completed their obligatory military service, had no criminal record, and were not communist sympathizers.

Finally, 350 applications were accepted who were mainly from the environs of Budapest, Nagykanizsa and Debrecen. They were mostly between 18 and 30 years old.

Their military training started on 10 January and took almost a month. The volunteers formed a battalion commanded by Captain Imre Kémeri Nagy. The Hungarian Volunteer Detached Battalion had 24 officers, 52 non-commissioned officers, 2 doctors and 2 padres; a total of 346 officers and men.

=== Going to Finland ===
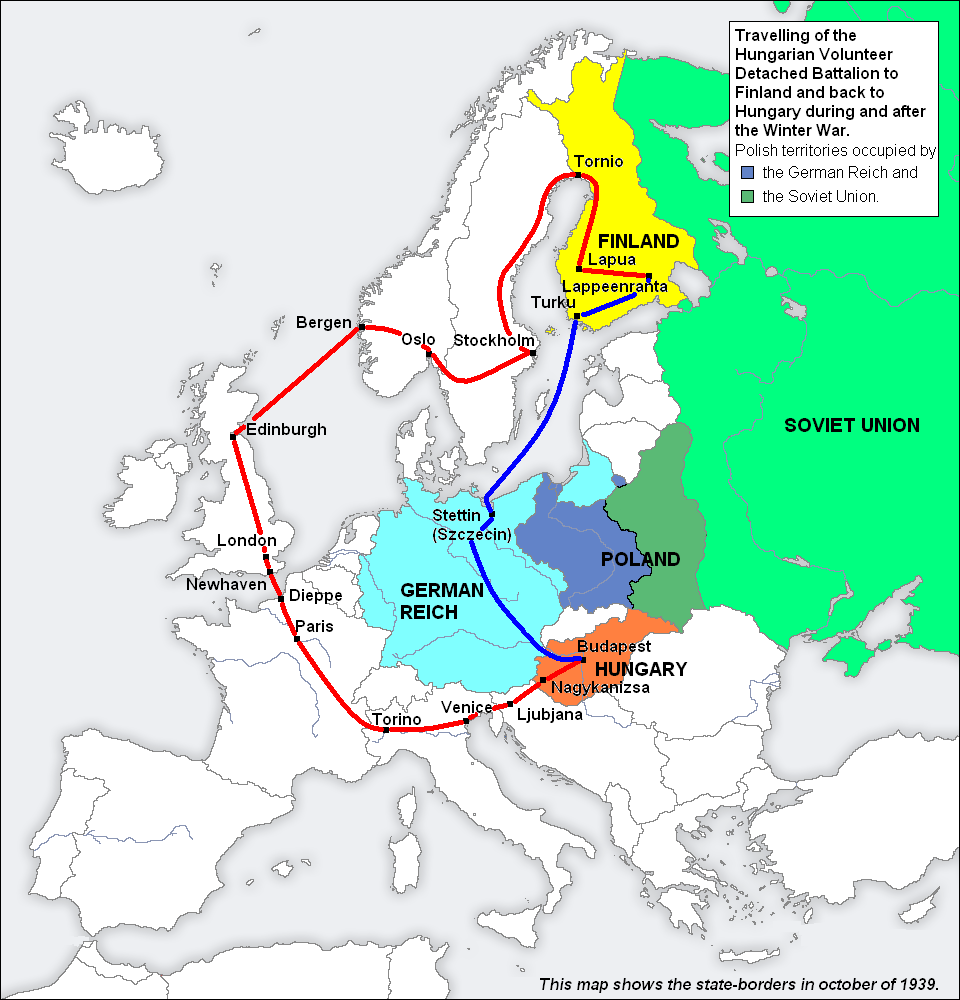
Routes taken by the Volunteer Detached Battalion to Finland (red line) and back to Hungary (blue line) during and after the Winter War.

Travel to Finland was very difficult, because the German Reich forbade transit of armaments and war equipment across its territory (including the occupied Polish territories). This was in one respect a simple honoring of the Molotov–Ribbentrop Pact, but was also because Teleki had not given the Wehrmacht permission to use Hungarian railway lines for attacking Poland. The German government was also unhappy that Teleki's government had harbored thousands of Polish refugees after the German and Soviet invasion of Poland because of the Hungarian–Polish friendship.

Because of this, volunteers had to travel across Yugoslavia, Italy, France, the United Kingdom, Norway and Sweden to make their way to Finland. They travelled without any weapons by a special train, officially classified as "tourists going to ski-camp". The battalion was embarked at Edinburgh to Bergen as a part of a convoy. This convoy had to be protected by air and naval cover because the United Kingdom and the German Reich were in a state of war and there was great fear of German attacks ("Phony War"). The battalion finally arrived in Finland on 2 March after three weeks of travel.

=== In Finland ===
In Finland the battalion was quartered in Lapua, in the training center of the international volunteers. In Lapua they took part in further military training, learning skiing and winter warfare. Before the Hungarian battalion could see military action, the Moscow Peace Treaty was signed, on 12 March in Moscow, so many volunteers were frustrated.

In the last days of March, Field Marshal Mannerheim visited Lapua where he met the Hungarian battalion. He expressed his thanks to the volunteers for coming to Finland and he promoted Lieutenant Imre Kémeri Nagy to Captain (this promotion was later accepted by the Hungarian General Staff). From 17 April to 19 May the Hungarian battalion served in Karelia, at the new state border in Lappeenranta.

=== Going back to Hungary ===
The Hungarian battalion was embarked at Turku on 20 May 1940, from where a steamboat sailed to Stettin, German Reich (now Szczecin, in Poland). In Turku, the Order of the White Rose of Finland was given to the Hungarian officers. They travelled across Nazi Germany by a special train with a German guard. The German government gave them special permission to use German railway lines in order to reach Hungary. Expenses of the homeward travel were paid by the Finnish Ministry of Defence. The volunteers arrived at Budapest on 28 May. They were welcomed by the prime minister, Count Pál Teleki.

== Other Hungarian volunteers in the Winter War ==
Outside the Hungarian Volunteer Detached Battalion other Hungarian volunteers fought in the Winter War in the Finnish army as individuals. 2nd Lieutenant Mátyás Pirityi served in the Finnish Air Force and took part in more than 20 sorties. Warrant Officer Vilmos Békássy's plane disappeared over the Gulf of Bothnia. Géza Szepessy, along with four fellows from the Military Technical College of Berlin, went to Finland, where he was wounded in action.

== Memory of the Hungarian volunteers ==
In Hungary during the communist regime (between 1949 and 1989) the history of the Hungarian volunteer battalion could not be studied (the list of the volunteers’ names was found in Finland). Survivors today are well over 90 years old. They could only orally recount their experiences during that time, therefore proper research of the battalion’s history could only start in the 1990s.

Many volunteers fell in World War II and some died of old age. From 1991 the Finnish and Hungarian veterans have been able to meet and visit each other. These meetings are supported in part by the Hungarian Ministry of Defence. In 1991 medallions were given to surviving Hungarian veterans at the Finnish Embassy in Budapest.

The memory of the Hungarian volunteers has been preserved by memorial tablets in Lapua and Lappeenranta, in Finland.

== See also ==
- Foreign support in the Winter War
