= Finnish Relief Fund =

Humanitarian aid organization

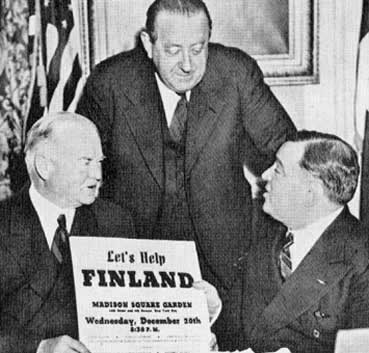
Herbert Hoover, Hendrik Willem van Loon and Fiorello H. La Guardia in Madison Square Garden on December 20, 1939.

The Finnish Relief Fund was a humanitarian aid organization initiated by former U.S. President Herbert Hoover in December 1939. It was intended to support Finland during the Winter War. By March 1940, it had raised 2.5 million US dollars.

Hoover's campaign was advertised in 1,400 newspapers across the United States. The largest contributions came from private donors ($1.9 million), newspaper ads ($652,869), industrial companies ($318,188) and labor unions ($27,294). The income from first screening of the film Gone with the Wind in the state of Washington was forwarded to the relief fund.

== See also ==
- Foreign support of Finland in the Winter War
- Commission for Polish Relief
