= Louis-Félix Henneguy =

French zoologist and embryologist

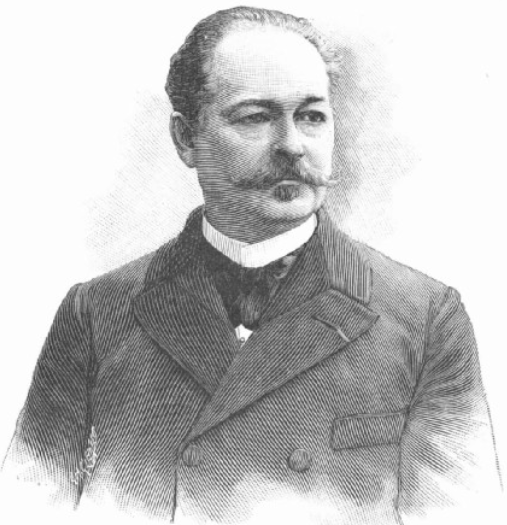
- Born: 18 March 1850
- Died: 16 January 1928; Paris
- Occupation: Professor
- Employer: Collège de France (1900–1928)
- Spouse: Catherine Henneguy
- Awards: Officer of the Legion of Honor; Serres prize (1905)

Louis-Félix Henneguy (18 March 1850 – 16 January 1928) was a French zoologist and embryologist born in Paris.

In 1875, he received his medical doctorate from the University of Montpellier with a dissertation on the physiological action of poisons, Étude physiologique sur l'action des poisons. In 1883 he obtained his agrégation with Les lichens utiles, a thesis on useful lichens.

During his career he was a professor of comparative embryology at the Collège de France (1900–28), and a member of the Académie de Médecine, the Académie d'Agriculture and the Académie des sciences (1908–28). From 1894 he was director of the journal, Archives d'anatomie microscopique.

He is known for his extensive research of phylloxera, publishing a number of papers on means of destroying its eggs during the winter (1885, 1887–88). Also he performed studies on the natural history of the apple blossom weevil, proposing methods for its eradication (1891). On behalf of the Marine Fisheries Advisory Committee, he did reviews involving the sale and consumption of mussels throughout the year.

With Hungarian neuroanatomist, Mihály Lenhossék (1863–1937), the "Henneguy–Lenhossek theory" is named, which states the claim that mitotic centrioles and ciliary basal kinetosomes are fundamentally the same structure.

As a taxonomist he circumscribed the apicomplexan genus Rhytidocystis, and the protozoan genera Thelohania and Fabrea. The genus Henneguya Thélohan, 1892 is named after him, as are the species Apherusa henneguyi Chevreux & Fage, 1925 and Ectinosoma henneguyi Labbé, 1926.

In 1903 he was appointed president of the Société entomologique de France.

== Written works ==
- Le Corps vitellin de Balbiani dans l’oeuf des vertébrés (1893)-- The body of Balbiani yolk in the egg of vertebrates.
- Lec¸ons sur la cellule : morphologie et reproduction (1896)--- Lessons on the cell: Morphology and reproduction.
- Recherches sur le développement des poissons osseux (Félix Alcan, Paris, 1889)-- Research on the development of bony fishes.
- Notice sur les titres et travaux scientifiques (1899)-- Brochure titles and scientific works.
- Traité des méthodes techniques de l'anatomie microscopique : histologie, embryologie et zoologie, a translation of the work of Arthur Bolles Lee (1849–1927), (O. Doin, Paris, 1887, re-edited in 1896 and in 1902).
- Les insectes, morphologie - reproduction - embryogenie, (1904)-- Insects; morphology, reproduction- embryology.
