= Ehrhardt 7.5 cm Model 1901 =

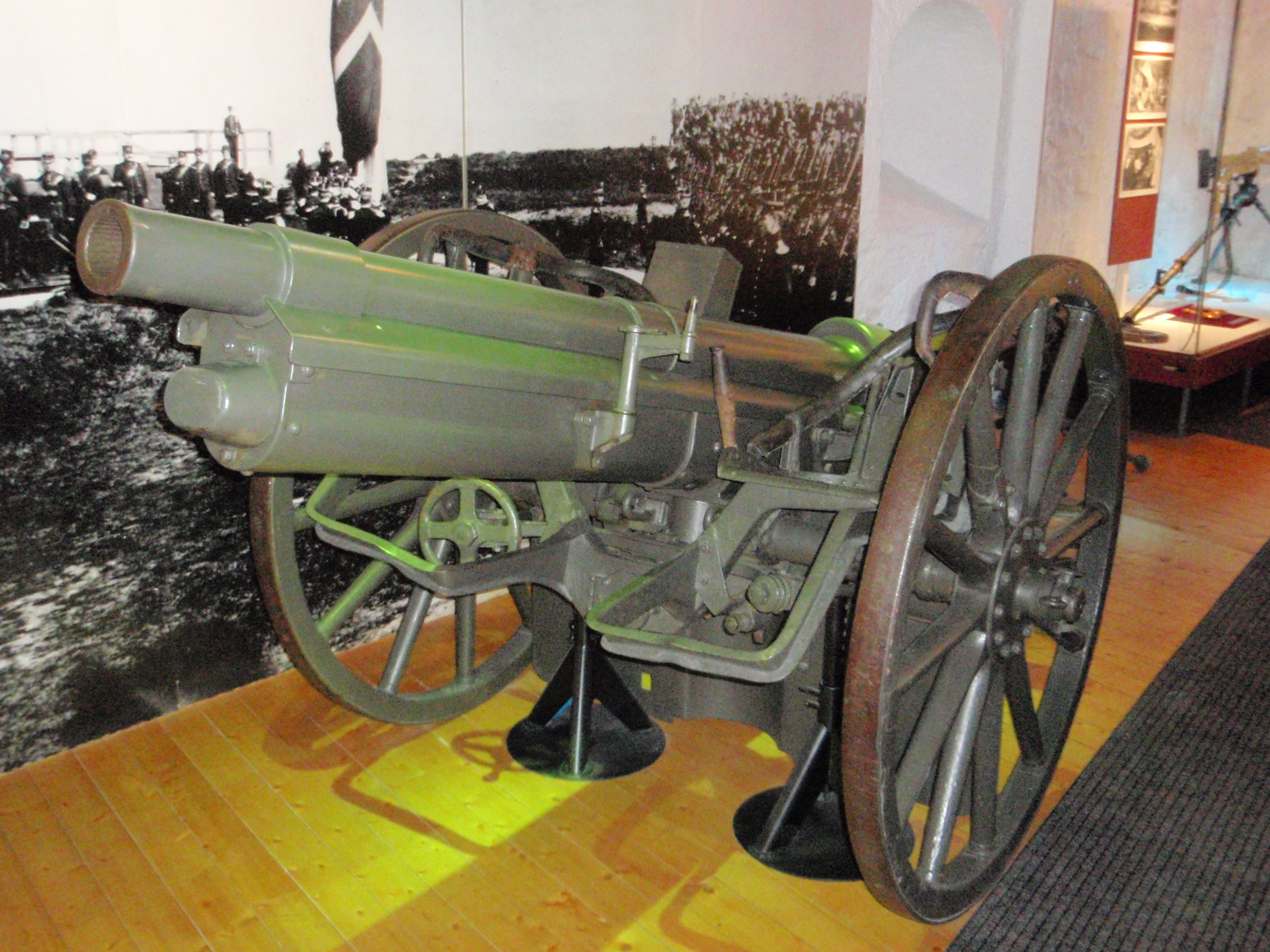
- Model 1901 on display in Trondheim, Norway.
- Type: field gun
- Place of origin: German Empire

Service history
- In service: 1901–1947
- Used by: Norway; Finland; Nazi Germany
- Wars: Winter War; Second World War; Continuation War

Production history
- Designer: Rheinmetall
- Manufacturer: Rheinmetall
- No. built: 138
- Variants: Horse- or lorry-drawn

Specifications
- Mass: 1,037 kilograms (2,286 lb)
- Barrel length: 2.167 metres (7 ft 1 in) L/31
- Shell: 6.5 kilograms (14 lb) shell, QF 75 x 278 mm R cartridge
- Caliber: 75 mm (2.95 in)
- Breech: Nordenfelt eccentric screw
- Recoil: Hydro-spring
- Carriage: Pole trail
- Elevation: 7° to +15.5°
- Traverse: 7°
- Rate of fire: 8 rpm
- Muzzle velocity: 500 m/s (1,640 ft/s)
- Maximum firing range: 10,000 metres (11,000 yd)

The Ehrhardt 7.5 cm Model 1901 (Also known as the 7.5 cm feltkanon m/01 or the M/01 7.5 cm (2.95 in) field gun) was a field gun designed and built by the German company Rheinische Metallwaren- und Maschinenfabrik and sold to Norway in 1901. It remained the main field artillery gun of the Norwegian Army until the German invasion of Norway in 1940. The Germans impressed the surviving guns and used them in Norway for the duration of the Second World War. They equipped German units in Norway and were used as coastal artillery guns; a number were even modified for use as anti-tank guns. A dozen guns were transferred by the Norwegian government to Finland during the Winter War and were used by them during the Continuation War as well.

The Model 1901 guns were obsolescent already during the inter-war period and were retired from active use by the Norwegians shortly after the end of the Second World War. Model 1901s are still employed as saluting guns at fortresses in Norway.

== Background ==
=== Swedish-Norwegian artillery committee ===
With the background of the rapid development of the artillery arm in the late 19th century and the invention of the quick-firing field gun, a Swedish-Norwegian artillery committee was established in 1899. The committee was to facilitate the procurement of new artillery for the Swedish and Norwegian armed forces. The new weapon was to solve the old time-consuming problem of the gun being pushed out of position by recoil with each shot. The committee consisted of six officers, three Swedish and three Norwegian. One of the Norwegian officers was Captain Georg Stang, the future Norwegian Minister of Defence in 1900–1902 and 1902–1903.

The Swedish-Norwegian committee reached only a single conclusion; that the calibre of the new weapon was to be 7.5 centimetres, based on tests with a French Schneider-Canet Model 1898 field gun. Four Schneider-Canet had been delivered to Norway at that time, and 16 more were on order. While the Swedish members of the committee wished for a conclusion to be reached in the shortest possible time, the Norwegians wished to bide their time and study the issue to the fullest. The reason for the Norwegians' lack of haste was probably that breech-loaded rifled guns had been introduced to the Norwegian Army only in 1887, and with the last of the Krupp 8.4 cm Model 1887s delivered in 1896 the Norwegian guns were still comparatively new. The Swedes on the other hand had replaced their rifled muzzle-loaders already in 1883 and were more ready for a replacement.

=== Trials and choice of gun ===
In the end nine different artillery systems were considered by the Norwegians, and eight bought or loaned for testing. Two guns were found to be within requirements, one 7.5 cm gun from Schneider-Canet and one of the same calibre from Rheinische Metallwaren- und Maschinenfabrik in Germany. After extensive testing under varied conditions, both summer and winter, during the years 1899–1901, and modifications of the artillery pieces to Norwegian specifications, the Ehrhardt 7.5 cm Model 1901 was chosen. The tests were carried out by the Field and Mountain Artillery School, and included a march across the Dovrefjell mountains to Stjørdal Municipality in Nord-Trøndelag. The Norwegian Ministry of Defence, now under the leadership of Georg Stang, chose the artillery system over protests from the opposition Conservative Party of Norway, which demanded that a new system from Krupp be tested before the new gun could be chosen. This criticism was brushed aside by the Ministry of Defence, stating that the military assessment had found the Model 1901 to be the best gun. Before the Ministry of Defence had reached its decision it tested a battery of Model 1901s against a battery of 7.5 cm Schneider-Canet guns. After further testing the Model 1901 was still considered the best choice, although it was decided that further changes to the design were needed.

== Procurement of the Model 1901 ==
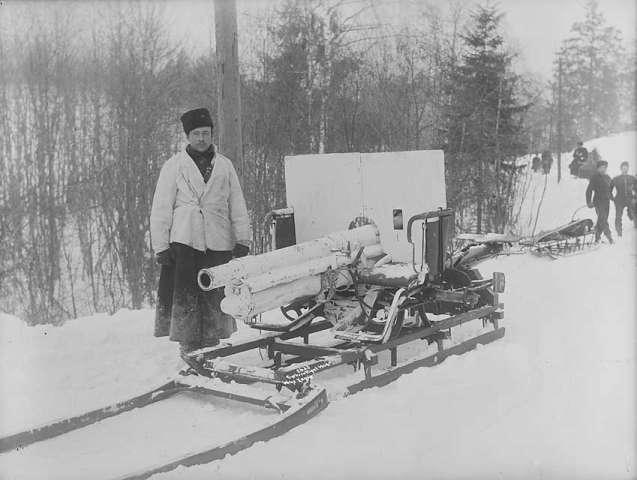
A Model 1901 dismantled for sled transport during winter manoeuvres in 1904.

In all 138 Ehrhardt 7.5 cm Model 1901s were manufactured, the type being delivered only to Norway. The Norwegian experience with the new system for quick-firing led to the major arms factories in Europe all adopting the same type of recoil system for their own artillery systems. Norwegian companies also modified the Armed Forces' older guns with the new recoil system so they could remain in service longer. Components that could be manufactured in Norway was produced under licence at Norwegian factories, with Norwegian labour organizations pushing for the creation of new jobs for the work force. The Ehrhardt Model 1901 was designated 7,5cm feltkanon M/1901 in Norwegian military service. The purchase of modern artillery for the Norwegian Army was motivated by the military build-up leading to the dissolution of the union between Norway and Sweden in 1905.

== General characteristics ==
The new artillery pieces consisted of a core tube and mantlet with a mechanism retainer, 28 rifles, Nordenfelt eccentric screw and hydraulic brakes with a spring system for returning the tube to position. This made the Model 1901 Norway's first quick-firing gun. The 1,000 kilograms (2,200 lb) gun's range was 10,000 metres (11,000 yd), firing a standard 6.5 kilograms (14 lb) shell. The Model 1901 was 2.235 metres (7 ft 4 in) long, with a barrel length of 2.167 metres (7 ft 1 in). The gun shields of the Model 1901 were detachable.

== Further development in Norway ==
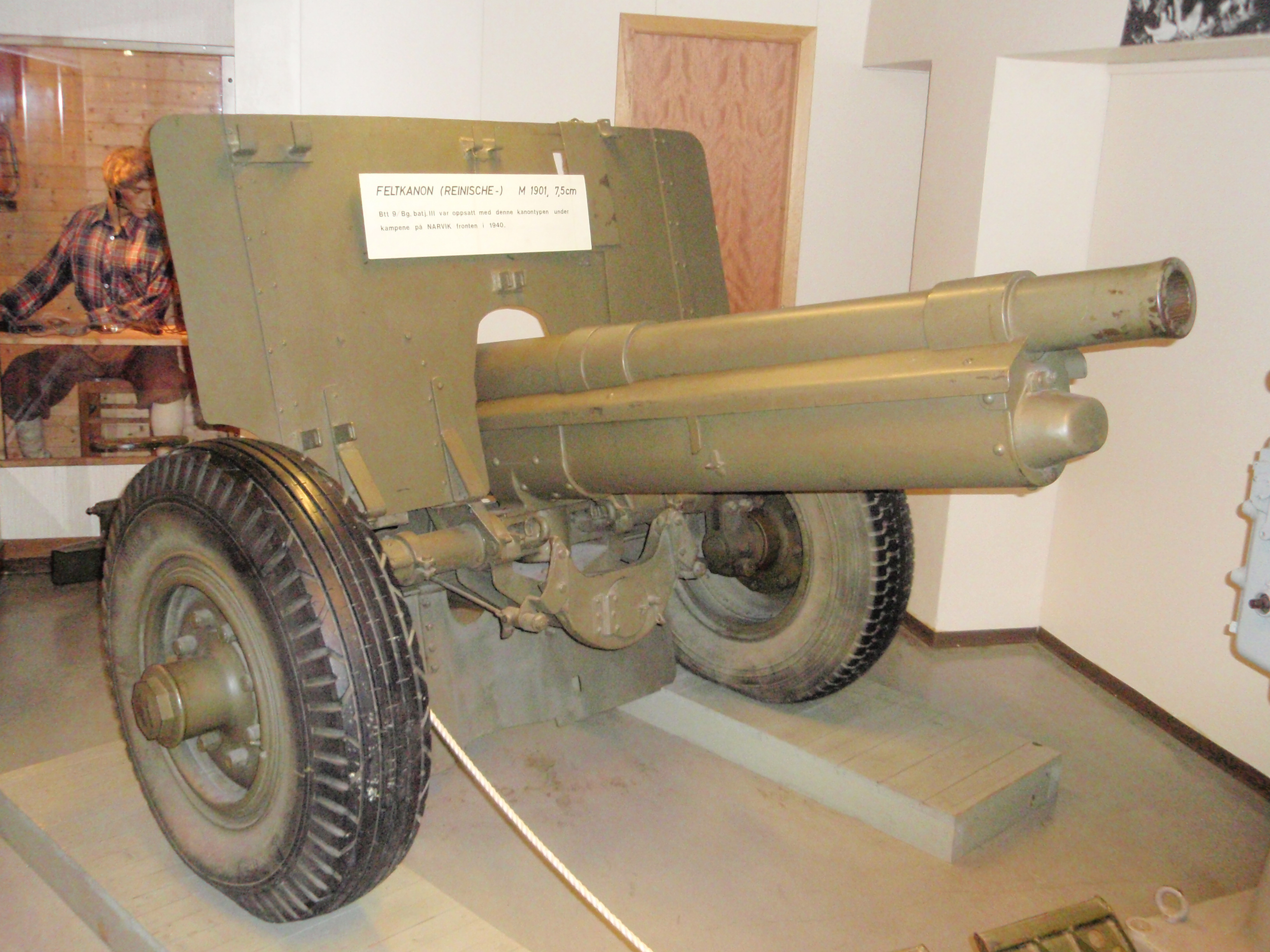
Model 1901 modified for motorized transport.

In the first years after 1901 the Model 1901's full potential could not be exploited due to a lack of effective aiming systems. The artillery pieces were delivered with open sights and could only be used for direct fire. New aiming systems were only introduced in 1911, when the field guns were modified at Kongsberg Armaments Factory and fitted with Goerz panoramic telescopes. This, together with other technical advances and the introduction of forward artillery observers, allowed effective indirect fire to be carried out.

=== Ammunition ===
Up until 1921 the ammunition used by the Norwegian artillery was the black-powder case shot and the high-explosive case shot. A high-explosive artillery shell with significantly longer range was introduced in 1921, but not put into regular use. A gas shell was also designed and approved in 1921, although never put into production.

=== Modifications ===
During the 1920s complaints about the performance of the gun started coming in to the authorities. Wear and tear was beginning to have an effect on the guns, and soon people were suggesting that the type should be replaced with a new field gun model. The demands for a new artillery system was rejected, and instead the old guns were sent to a full maintenance overhaul. The maintenance solved the problems with the Model 1901, some guns also being fitted with rubber tires and rebuilt for motor transport during the 1930s. By 1940 at least 12 artillery pieces had been modified for motor transport. Until 9 April 1940 German invasion of Norway the gun remained the main field gun of the Norwegian Army.

== Second World War ==
=== Norwegian Campaign ===
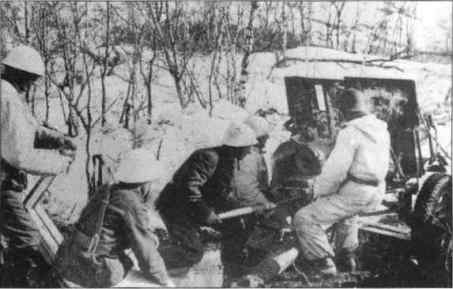
Model 1901 with modernized carriage in action at Narvik.

On 9 April 1940 Nazi Germany invaded Norway, capturing ports along the Norwegian coast from Oslo to Narvik. The main field artillery piece of the Norwegian Army that faced the invasion forces was the Ehrhardt Model 1901. During the two months of fighting in the Norwegian campaign that followed the Norwegian field artillery arm suffered greatly from organizational difficulties. The difficulties originated in part from the fact that very few artillery pieces had been mobilized during the seven months of neutrality that preceded the invasion. The units that had been activated to guard Norwegian neutrality had been equipped mainly with rifles and light and heavy machine guns. In the confusion and chaos that followed the German invasion most Norwegian units were only mobilized on an improvised basis, with limited supplies and little time to get properly organized before going into battle with the Germans. Only in Northern and Western Norway did the units (the 6th Division in Northern Norway and the 4th Brigade in Western Norway) have time to mobilize in an orderly fashion. Due to the complete lack of dedicated anti-tank guns in the Norwegian Army, (Note: The Norwegian leadership decided in December 1939 to establish a fully motorized anti-tank company, designated a "blocking company" (Norwegian: Sperrekompani). The 306-man strong company was to sort under the engineer arm of the army, despite army demands that it be part of the infantry. The company was supposed to be armed with heavy machine guns and 20 mm automatic cannon, the latter having been ordered from Nazi Germany. In March 1940 the Commanding General, Kristian Laake, requested from the Ministry of Defence that the Army's anti-tank capability be further strengthened with a second blocking company, to be part of the 6th Division in Northern Norway. Laake also wanted heavier 37 mm anti-tank guns to be imported from German arms manufacturers. Finally Laake wanted the anti-tank companies to be manned by professional soldiers rather than conscripts. The first 20 and 37 mm guns had been expected to be delivered from Germany in April and May 1940.) Model 1901s were pressed into service in an improvised anti-tank role during the fighting in Eastern Norway. The field guns were used in direct fire mode at close range against German Panzers. All 12 of the Model 1901 field guns that had been converted to motorized transport were deployed to Northern Norway at the outbreak of war, with four in Troms County and eight in the eastern parts of Finnmark. Seven of these guns saw action on the Narvik front, supporting the Norwegian counter-offensive against Eduard Dietl's Gebirgsjägers.

=== In Finnish service ===
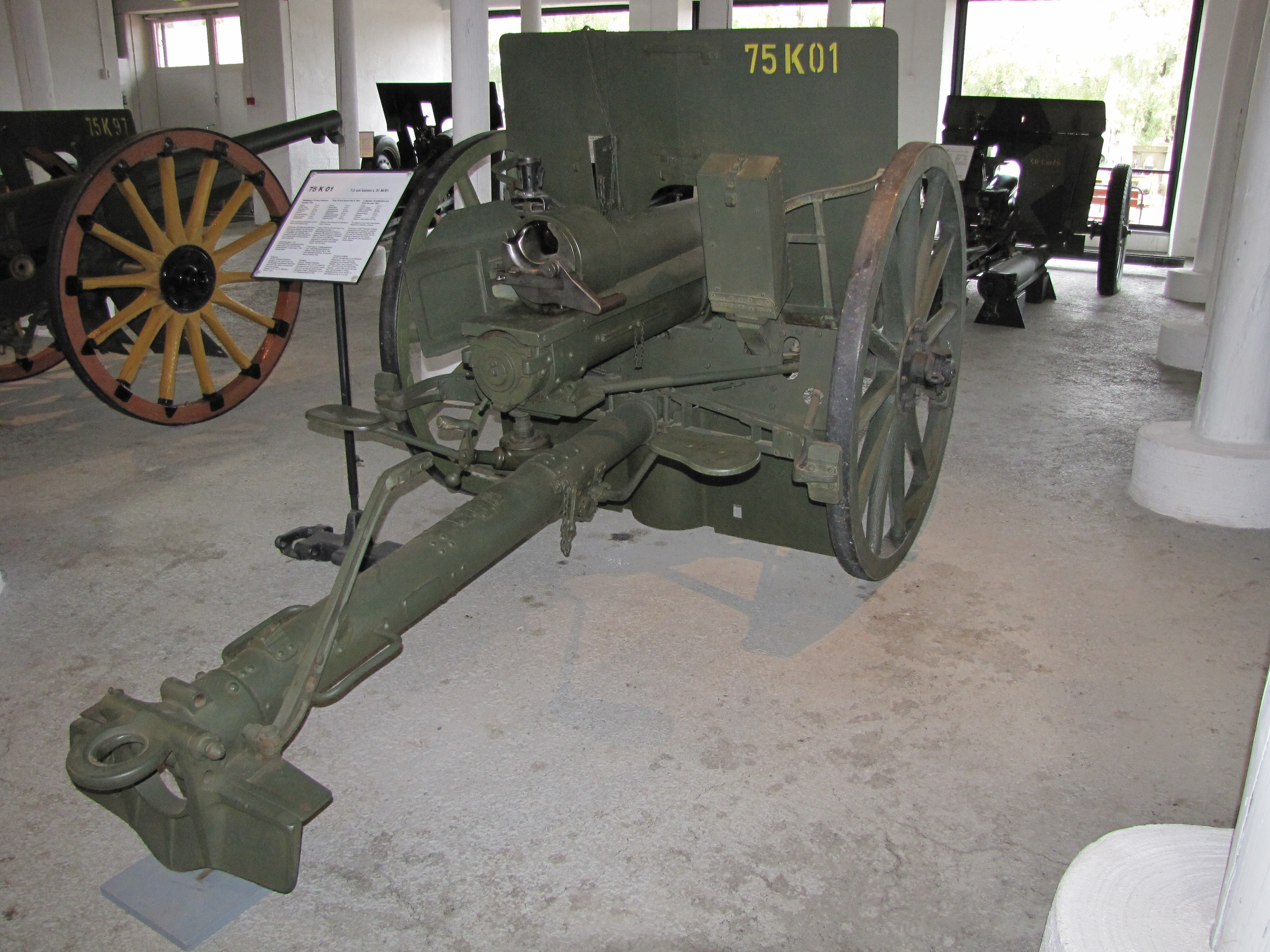
Rear view of a 75 K 01 piece on display at the Artillery Museum of Finland.

As part of its covert support for Finland during the 1939–1940 Winter War, the Norwegian government donated a field artillery battalion to the Finnish Army in February 1940. The guns were taken from stocks of artillery that had become surplus to requirement after large-scale cuts to the Norwegian military during the interwar period. The artillery pieces were delivered in response to a request for arms supplies from the Finnish foreign minister Väinö Tanner on 8 December 1939. In addition to artillery the Finns had also requested various types of ammunition, fighter aircraft and hand grenades, weapons that Norway could not provide. The secret transfer of the Model 1901 guns to Finland was a clear violation of the rules of neutrality on behalf of the Norwegian government. The 12 guns were delivered with 7,166 shells via the Swedish Bofors armaments company. In Finland the guns were given the designation 75 K 01. Eleven of the guns saw service in the Winter War with Field Artillery Regiment 9, firing some 36,400 shells during the conflict. More ammunition for the guns were later procured by the Finnish Army from Norwegian ammunition stocks captured by the Germans in 1940. During the Continuation War the guns were first issued to the fortification artillery, from 1942 being transferred to the coastal artillery arm.

=== In German service ===
When Nazi Germany conquered Norway in the two-month-long Norwegian Campaign in 1940 they captured many examples of the Norwegian 7,5 cm feltkanon m/01 and re-designated them 7.5 cm FK. 246(n). The guns remained in German service in Norway until the end of the war, amongst other uses deployed in coastal artillery fortifications. During their 1940–1945 occupation of Norway the Germans rebuilt at least 17 Model 1901s as anti-tank guns.

== Post-war use ==
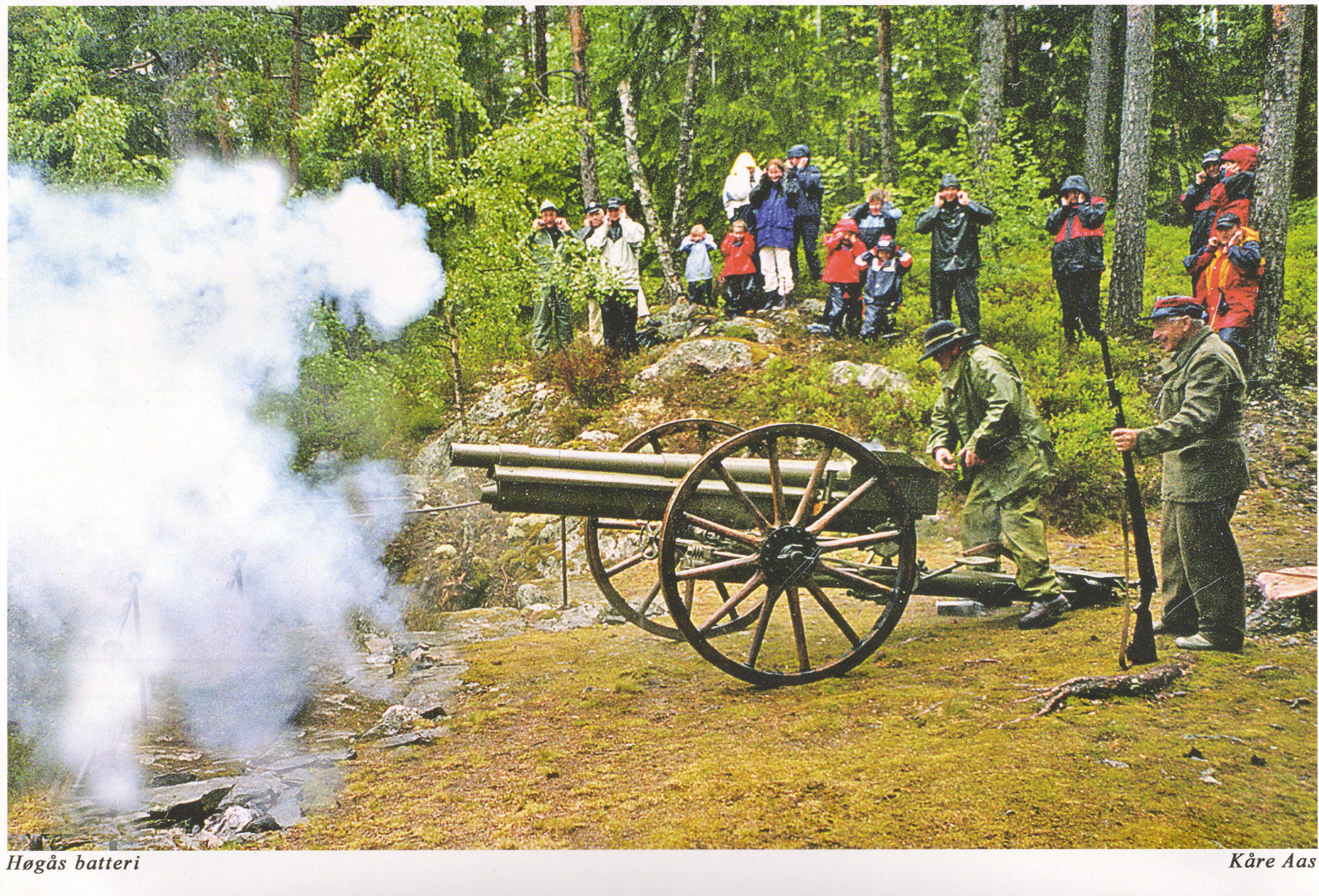
Model 1901 used as saluting gun during the commemoration of the 100th anniversary of the dissolution of the union between Norway and Sweden in 1905

After the end of the Second World War the 7,5cm feltkanon M/1901 was quickly replaced with more modern types in the Norwegian Army. The last time the artillery system was used for sharpshooting exercises was with the concluding exercise of the Field Artillery's Officer School in August 1947 at Hjerkinn training area. Following the type's retirement from active duty the Model 1901 has continued into the 21st century as a saluting gun at many Norwegian fortresses, including at Akershus Fortress in Oslo. The gun had a central role in the 2005 commemoration of the 100th anniversary of the dissolution of the union between Norway and Sweden in 1905.

== Bibliography ==
- Chamberlain, Peter & Gander, Terry. Light and Medium Field Artillery. New York: Arco, 1975
- Gamst, Thorbein (1998). Befalsskolen for Feltartilleriet: 1931–1996 (in Norwegian). Oslo: Artilleriregimetet og Artilleriets Offisersforening. ISBN 82-994652-0-6.
- Hobson, Rolf; Tom Kristiansen (2001). Norsk forsvarshistorie bind 3: 1905-1940 (in Norwegian). Bergen: Eide Forlag. ISBN 82-514-0618-8.
- Holm, Terje H. (1987). 1940 – igjen? (in Norwegian). Oslo: Norwegian Armed Forces Museum. ISBN 82-991167-2-4.
- Kristiansen, Tom (2008). Tysk trussel mot Norge? Forsvarsledelse, trusselvurderinger og militære tiltak før 1940 (in Norwegian). Bergen: Fagbokforlaget. ISBN 978-82-450-0674-2.
- Zeiner-Gundersen, Herman Fredrik (1986). Norsk artilleri gjennom 300 år (in Norwegian). Arendal: Agdin Forlag. ISBN 82-7360-003-3.

== Additional resources ==
- Gander, Terry and Chamberlain, Peter. Weapons of the Third Reich: An Encyclopedic Survey of All Small Arms, Artillery and Special Weapons of the German Land Forces 1939-1945. New York: Doubleday, 1979 ISBN 0-385-15090-3
