= Mihály Lenhossék =

Hungarian anatomist and histologist

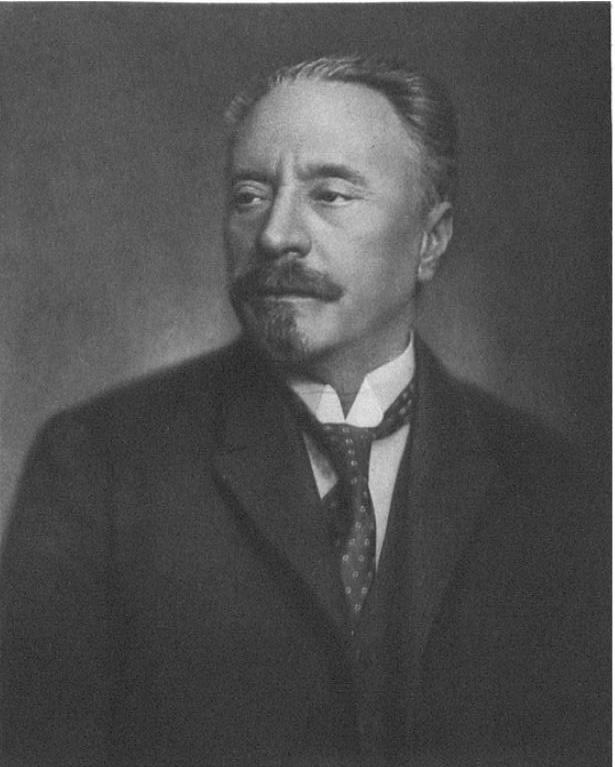
Mihály Lenhossék (1863–1937)

Mihály Lenhossék, named often given as Michael von Lenhossék (28 August 1863 – 26 January 1937) was a Hungarian anatomist and histologist born in Budapest. He was the son of anatomist József Lenhossék (1818–1888) and an uncle to Albert Szent-Györgyi (1893–1986).

In 1886, he obtained his medical doctorate at Budapest, afterwards working in his father's anatomical institute. In 1889 he became prosector at the University of Basel, later performing similar duties at the University of Würzburg (1892–95). Afterwards he was an associate professor of anatomy at the University of Tübingen, and from 1900 was a professor of anatomy at the University of Budapest.

Lenhossék is largely remembered for his research in the field of neuroanatomy, that included important histological studies of the nervous system. In 1893 he coined the term "astrocyte" to describe a star-shaped cell found in the central nervous system.

== Associated terms ==
- "Henneguy–Lenhossek theory": Theory that proposes that mitotic centrioles and ciliary basal kinetosomes are fundamentally similar structures. Named with French embryologist Louis-Félix Henneguy (1850–1928). Lenhossék describes his findings in an 1898 paper titled Über Flimmerzellen.
- "Lenhossek's processes": Short processes ("aborted axons") possessed by some ganglion cells.

== Selected writings ==
- Die Geschmacksknospen (Wurzburg 1894)
- Beiträge zur Histologie des Nervensystems und der Sinnesorgane (Wiesbaden 1895)
- Der feinere Bau des Nervensystems im Lichte neuester Forschungen (second edition Berlin 1895).
