= Commission for Polish Relief =

Organization

The Commission for Polish Relief (CPR), also known unofficially as Comporel or the Hoover Commission, was initiated in late 1939 by former US President Herbert Hoover, following the German and Soviet occupation of Poland. The Commission provided relief to Nazi occupied territories of Poland until December 1941.

== Background ==
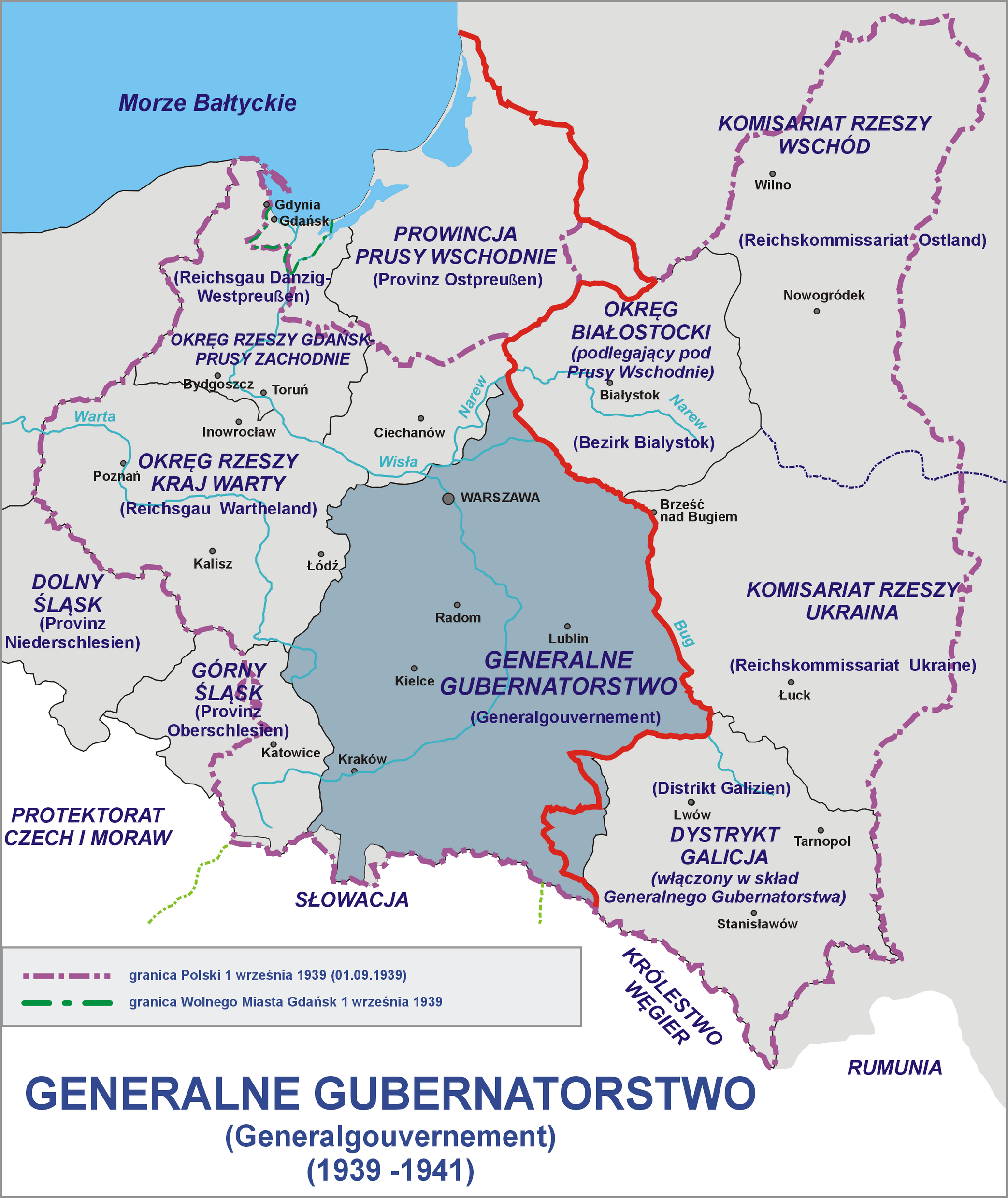
Polish territories under occupation by the Soviet Union and Nazi Germany 1939–1941.

Following the conquest of Poland by Nazi Germany and the USSR, the country's most fertile agricultural land was annexed to Germany in October 1939. The remaining area of German-occupied Poland (the General Government) did not produce enough food to feed its population. National Socialist People's Welfare, Nazi Germany relief service, was not providing adequate service and very soon started to exclude Jews from its aid programmes. Herbert Hoover testified before the House Committee on Foreign Affairs that around 400 to 500 million US dollars would be needed to feed approximately 7 million of destitute people in Poland, and argued that at least a quarter of that should be provided by the US.

Both Polish and Jewish populations in areas of Nazi Germany occupied were considered by German authorities to be "sub-humans" (Untermenschen) and as such targeted for extermination and slavery. Under Nazi plans, deliberate starvation of what were considered "sub-humans" was considered. From the beginning of Nazi occupation of Poland food was forcefully confiscated from Polish population by Nazi authorities to be used for benefit of Nazi Germany By mid 1941, the German minority in Poland received 2613 calories per day while Poles received 699 and Jews in the ghetto 184. The Jewish ration fulfilled 7.5 percent of their daily needs; Polish rations only 26 percent. Only the ration allocated to Germans fulfilled the full needs of their daily calorie intake.

The Nazis-based food rations on racist basis with Germans considered "Übermenschen" receiving biggest food rations in Nazi occupied territories of Poland, with little spared for Polish and Jewish population:

Distribution of food in German occupied Poland as of XII 1941
Nationality	Daily calorie intake
Germans	2,310
Foreigners	1,790
Ukrainians	930
Poles	654
Jews	184

Prior to the war the General Government was not self-sufficient in agricultural production and was a net importer of food from other regions of Poland. Despite this food deficit the German occupiers confiscated 27% of the agricultural output in the General Government, thus reducing the food available for the civilian population. This Nazi policy caused a humanitarian crisis in Poland's urban areas. In 1940 20 to 25% of the population the Government General depended on outside relief aid. This crisis was made worse by the German expulsion of 923,000 Polish citizens from Polish areas annexed by Nazi Germany into the General Government. The Germans "showed no concern for the destination of the dislocated families" who depended on the local Polish welfare services.Richard C. Lukas points out "To be sure, the Poles would have starved to death if they had to depend on the food rationed to them To supplement the meager rations allocated by the Germans ( see table above) Poles depended on the black market in order to survive. During the war 80% of the population's needs were met by the black market Poles involved in the black market "risked arrest, deportation to a concentration camp, and even death" The German occupiers maintained a large police force to eliminate the black market. During the war there was an increase in infectious diseases caused by the general malnutrition among the Polish population. In 1940 the tuberculosis rate among Poles, not including Jews, was 420 per 100,000 compared to 136 per 100,000 prior to the war. Also Poles were pressured to sign up for work in Germany hoping to improve their living standards, but most were disappointed when they found low wages and humiliating treatment in Germany.

The brutal occupation policy of Germany resulted in a huge death toll. Prior to the establishment of the death camps in mid 1942 one-fifth (500–600,000) of Polish Jews perished in ghettos and labor camps. Apart from 2.3 million non-Jewish Poles killed directly during the course of the war an additional 473,000 perished due to the harsh conditions of the occupation,

Additionally the Generalplan Ost plan of Nazis which envisioned elimination of Slavic population in occupied territories, and artificial famines – as proposed in Hunger Plan – were to be used.

== Organisation and operations of the Commission for Polish Relief ==
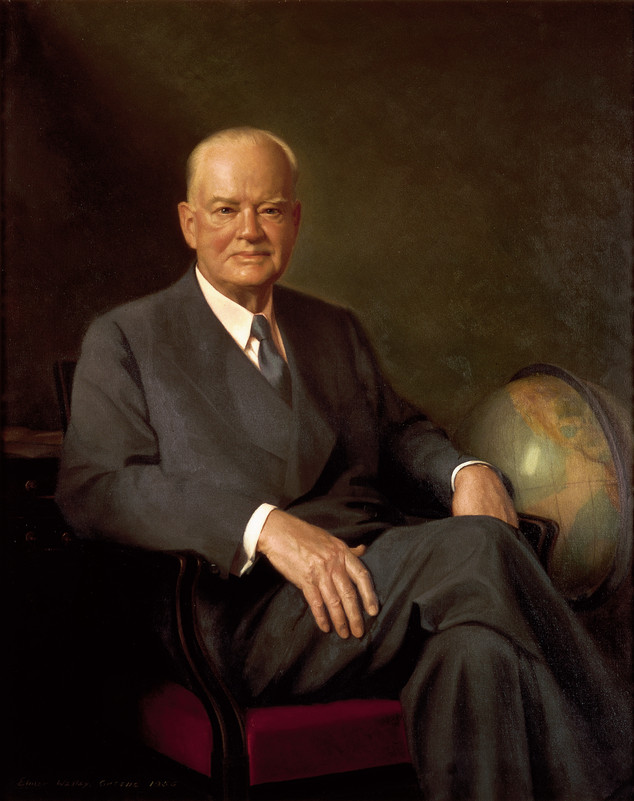
Hoover's official White House portrait painted by Elmer Wesley Greene.

The Commission was organized on 25 September 1939, following an appeal by the Polish Government in Exile.

The Commission was led by Maurice Pate and Chauncey McCormick with Herbert Hoover as (Honorary) Chairman. Funding came from governments and private charities as well as the American Red Cross. Polish–American organizations in the United States donated $400,000; the Polish Government in Exile, $186,225. The Commission eventually collected $6,000,000, including $3,060,704 in Polish gold deposited in the National Bank of Romania (which proved more difficult to obtain).

The Commission provided food (such as evaporated milk, rye flour, vegetable fats, sugar and hominy grits) and clothing to Polish refugees throughout Europe, such as the 50,000 Polish refugees in France, and to 200,000 malnourished children, women and elderly inside occupied Poland that were fed daily from canteens. The Commission is said to have delivered 150 tonnes of supplies within a few months, and in early 1940 CPR organized kitchens served 200,000 meals a day.

The shipments were sent using from the United States to Sweden and then to German ports like Hamburg or Danzig. After the German invasion of Norway the route was changed to Genoa or Lisbon, from where the food was shipped by rail to occupied Poland. After Italy entered the war on the German side, Italian railroads no longer carried aid, and the shipments were rerouted to Vilnius.

The Nazi government provided guarantees that ships from neutral countries that transported the relief would not be targeted by Kriegsmarine submarines and CPR was allowed to operate in occupied Poland (for example, in July 1941, two depots existed in Kraków and Warsaw). At the same time, Nazis were opposed to CPR requests that American nationals are allowed to distribute the supplies, or that their aid be extended to Jews. It was only around summer 1940 that the Germans agreed to allow American nationals to accompany the shipments to Poland, but German Red Cross (which at the time was under Nazi control, headed by Reichsartz of SS Ernst Grawitz) was to act as a liaison between them and the local groups.

== Reduction and ending of relief ==
Soon after Poland's defeat in October 1939, controversies arose on whether the Nazis could be trusted to distribute the food properly. Contributions from the Polish-American community dropped, as the community became split over that issue. By early spring 1940, CPR efforts were much reduced in effectiveness as a result of the drop in donations and Nazi government opposition.

The matters were further complicated as the UK had a naval blockade in place against delivery of food to territory controlled by Nazi Germany. At first it was possible to get exceptions to the blockade from the British, and this was regularly the case while Neville Chamberlain was Prime Minister. The US government and the American Red Cross (ARC) spoke in favor of the blockade, which played a role in diverting donations from the CPR to the ARC. The Roosevelt Administration attempted to minimize aid to Poland as it preferred to focus on aiding the UK and France and wanted to avoid being drawn into the war.

In May 1940, Winston Churchill replaced Chamberlain as the UK Prime Minister, and his policy made it much more difficult to ship food to continental Europe. In August 1940, the British Government decided to not permit any further aid shipments to areas in Europe under occupation by Nazi Germany. This decision was motivated by the Nazi conquest of Denmark, Norway, the Low Countries and France, the growing importance of economic warfare and difficulties experienced by the Americans in adequately supervising the distribution of supplies in Poland. The British government believed that the Nazi German government could not be trusted to allow aid to be delivered to its intended recipients and that there was no way of supervising how it was actually used. Given the large population in the German-occupied countries, the British were also concerned that the amount of goods which would be delivered through an aid program would free up considerable reserves of Nazi Germany manpower. On 7 June, the British Foreign Office also learned that the German government had withdrawn all offers to facilitate American relief aid to Polish territories under Nazi occupation and interpreted this as meaning that the Commission for Polish Relief and a Red Cross aid program to the country had broken down. As a result, and after extensive discussions by the British cabinet and between government departments, Churchill announced on 20 August that Britain would maintain a strict blockade of Nazi Germany and countries it occupied. He also stated that while Nazi Germany must be responsible for feeding its occupied countries, Britain would make preparations to rapidly provide aid to any territories which were liberated from Nazi control. This policy was supported by the European governments in exile which were based in London, though the promise of aid once territories were liberated was made in response to concerns they raised about the blockade potentially encouraging people in occupied countries to cooperate with the Nazi German forces.

At the time of its announcement, the British government had no evidence that there was any actual or impending starvation in Europe and believed that food supplies would be adequate to prevent significant shortages until the spring of 1941. Nazi German propaganda statements made at this time also claimed that no part of Nazi-occupied Europe would go short of food, and on 26 June the Deutschlandsender radio station had broadcast a statement explicitly rejecting aid from Herbert Hoover's organisation to feed the populations of Belgium, France and the Netherlands.

The British Government was concerned about the reaction in the United States to its decision to cut off aid to Nazi occupied Europe. The United States government supported the blockade, with Under Secretary of State Sumner Welles telling the British ambassador Lord Lothian on 13 July, more than a month before the blockade was announced, that President Roosevelt, the US State Department and American public opinion all were opposed to "any action which would relieve pressure on Germany by feeding the distressed people of Europe". Secretary of State Cordell Hull later told Lord Lothian that an argument in favour of the blockade was that experience had shown that it was impossible to arrange any system of providing relief that did not, directly or indirectly, increase the food available to the German government.

Hoover campaigned against the British blockade. He was critical of Churchill, and later wrote that for Churchill, civilian starvation, if speeding up the end of the war, was justified. On 11 August 1940, Hoover issued a statement arguing that there was no reason why aid could not be sent to Europe through a neutral non-government organisation. This statement specified that such a scheme should go ahead only if the German government agreed to not take food from the occupied countries—which the Nazis were doing in Poland from the start of the occupation. Other demands by Hoover included permitting imports from the USSR and Balkan countries, granting unimpeded passage to aid ships and allowing the non-government organisation to control the distribution of aid to the degree necessary for it to be confident that these guarantees were being met. Hoover also requested that the British allow aid shipments as long as the German Government met the conditions he had specified and asked that the governments in exile provide funding for aid supplies. He also argued that "the obvious truth is that there will be wholesale starvation, death and disease in these little countries unless something is done about it". The US Government did not support Hoover's statement and it also failed to win public support. An opinion poll conducted on 1 September 1940 found that only 38 percent of Americans believed that the country should send food aid if famine broke out in Nazi-occupied European countries of Belgium, France and the Netherlands. Nevertheless, a campaign to provide food relief to Europe continued in the US until the end of the war, though it attracted little attention after the attack on Pearl Harbor in December 1941.

In response to the British blockade, the Commission for Polish Relief attempted to purchase food from the Soviet Union and the Baltic states, but the results were meager. The Commission was able to continue to provide a very limited amount of relief to Poland until December 1941, when Nazi Germany declared war on the United States. The Commission operated for several more years, providing aid to Poles outside German-occupied territories. Hoover Institution Archives list the Commission documents from up to 1949.

== See also ==
- Finnish Relief Fund (World War II, another of Hoover's initiatives)
- Committee for Relief in Belgium (World War I)
- American Relief Administration (post World War I)
- SS Kurtuluş (World War II, Greece)
- Operations Manna and Chowhound (World War II, Netherlands)
- German domestic food policy during WW2
- American Jewish Joint Distribution Committee Provided Relief for Polish Jews prior to Dec. 1941
