= Black market in Poland =

Modern-era black market in Poland arose shortly after the country regained its independence in the aftermath of World War I, and its government passed legislation outlawing or regulating certain types of trade. It continued during the period of World War II and communist People's Republic of Poland.
