= Albert Szent-Györgyi =

Hungarian biochemist (1893–1986), Nobel Prize winner

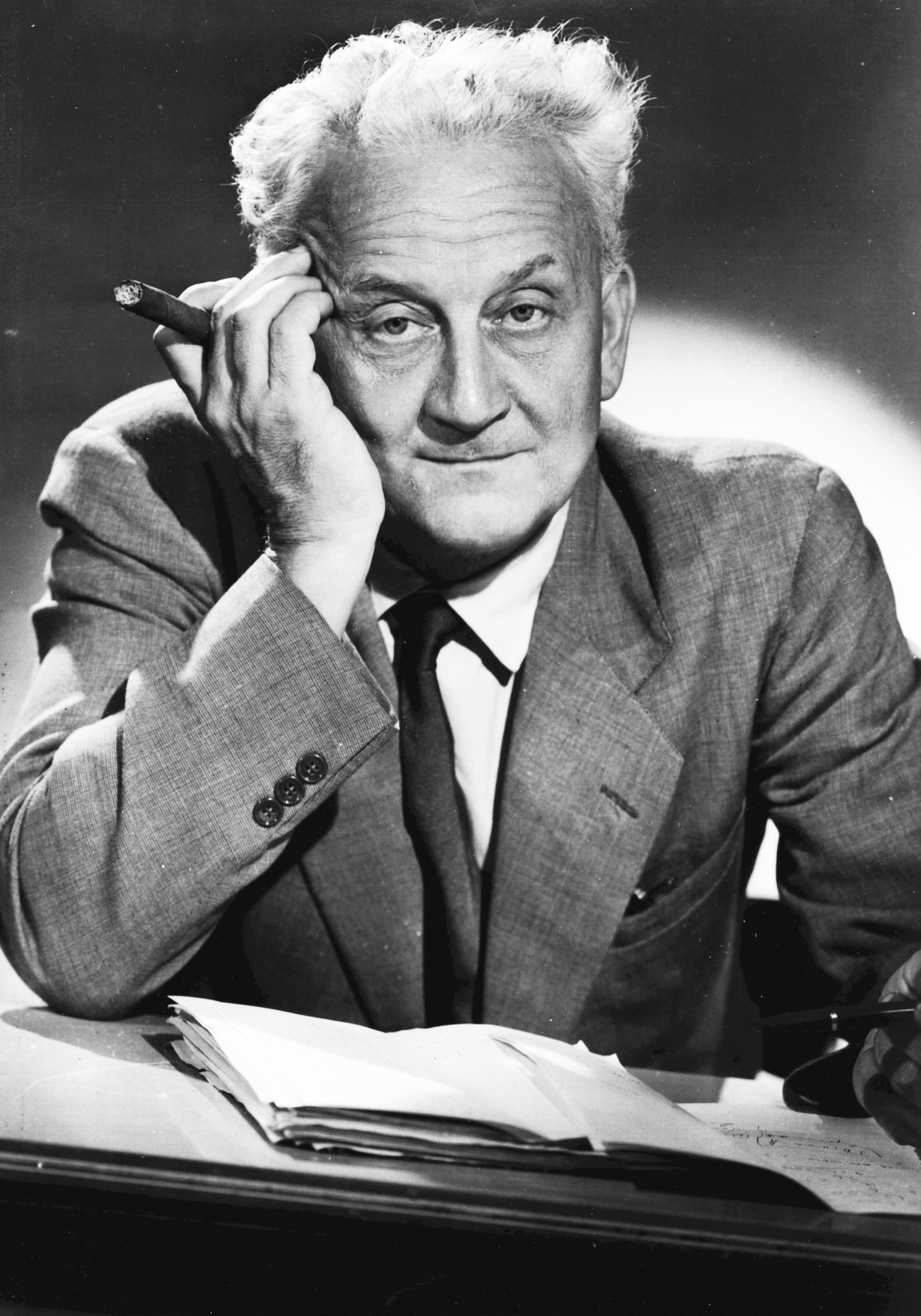
- Szent-Györgyi c. 1950
- Born: Albert Imre Szent-Györgyi; September 16, 1893; Budapest, Kingdom of Hungary, Austria-Hungary
- Died: October 22, 1986 (aged 93); Woods Hole, Massachusetts, US
- Citizenship: Hungary; US
- Education: Semmelweis University (MD); University of Cambridge (PhD)
- Known for: Vitamin C, discovering the components and reactions of the citric acid cycle
- Spouses: Kornélia Demény (1917–1938); Márta Borbíró (1941–1963); June Susan Wichterman (1965–1968); Marcia Houston (1975–1986)
- Awards: Nobel Prize in Physiology or Medicine (1937); Cameron Prize for Therapeutics of the University of Edinburgh (1946); Albert Lasker Award for Basic Medical Research (1954)
- Scientific career
- Fields: Physiology, biochemistry
- Workplaces: University of Szeged; University of Cambridge; Marine Biological Laboratory
- Thesis: Observations on the functions of peroxidase systems and the chemistry of the adrenal cortex (1929)
- Doctoral advisor: Frederick Gowland Hopkins

Signature
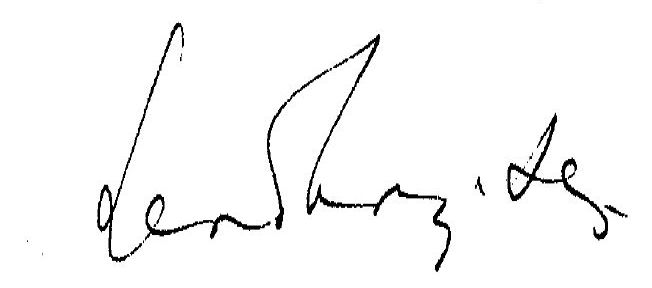

Albert Imre Szent-Györgyi (Note: /sɛnt ˈdʒɜːrdʒi/ sent JUR-jee, also UK: /- ˈdʒɔːr-/ - JOR-, US: /seɪnt ˈdʒɔːrdʒ(i)/ saynt JORJ(-ee).) de Nagyrápolt (Hungarian: nagyrápolti Szent-Györgyi Albert Imre; September 16, 1893 – October 22, 1986) was a Hungarian biochemist who won the Nobel Prize in Physiology or Medicine in 1937. He is credited with first isolating vitamin C and discovering many of the components and reactions of the citric acid cycle and the molecular basis of muscle contraction.

== Early life ==
Szent-Györgyi was born in Budapest, Kingdom of Hungary, on September 16, 1893. His father, Miklós Szent-Györgyi, was a landowner, born in Marosvásárhely, Transylvania (today Târgu Mureş, Romania), a Calvinist, and could trace his ancestry back to 1608 when Sámuel, a Calvinist predicant, was ennobled. At the time of Szent-Györgyi's birth, being of the nobility was considered important and created opportunities that otherwise were not available. (Miklós Szent-Györgyi's parents were Imre Szent-Györgyi and Mária Csiky). His mother, Jozefina, a Roman Catholic, was a daughter of József Lenhossék and Anna Bossányi. Jozefina was a sister of Mihály Lenhossék; both of these men were Professors of Anatomy at the Eötvös Loránd University. His family included three generations of scientists. Music was important in the Lenhossék family. His mother Jozefina prepared to become an opera singer and auditioned for Gustav Mahler, then a conductor at the Budapest Opera. He advised her to marry instead, since her voice was not enough. Albert himself was good at the piano, while his brother Pál became a professional violinist.

== Education ==
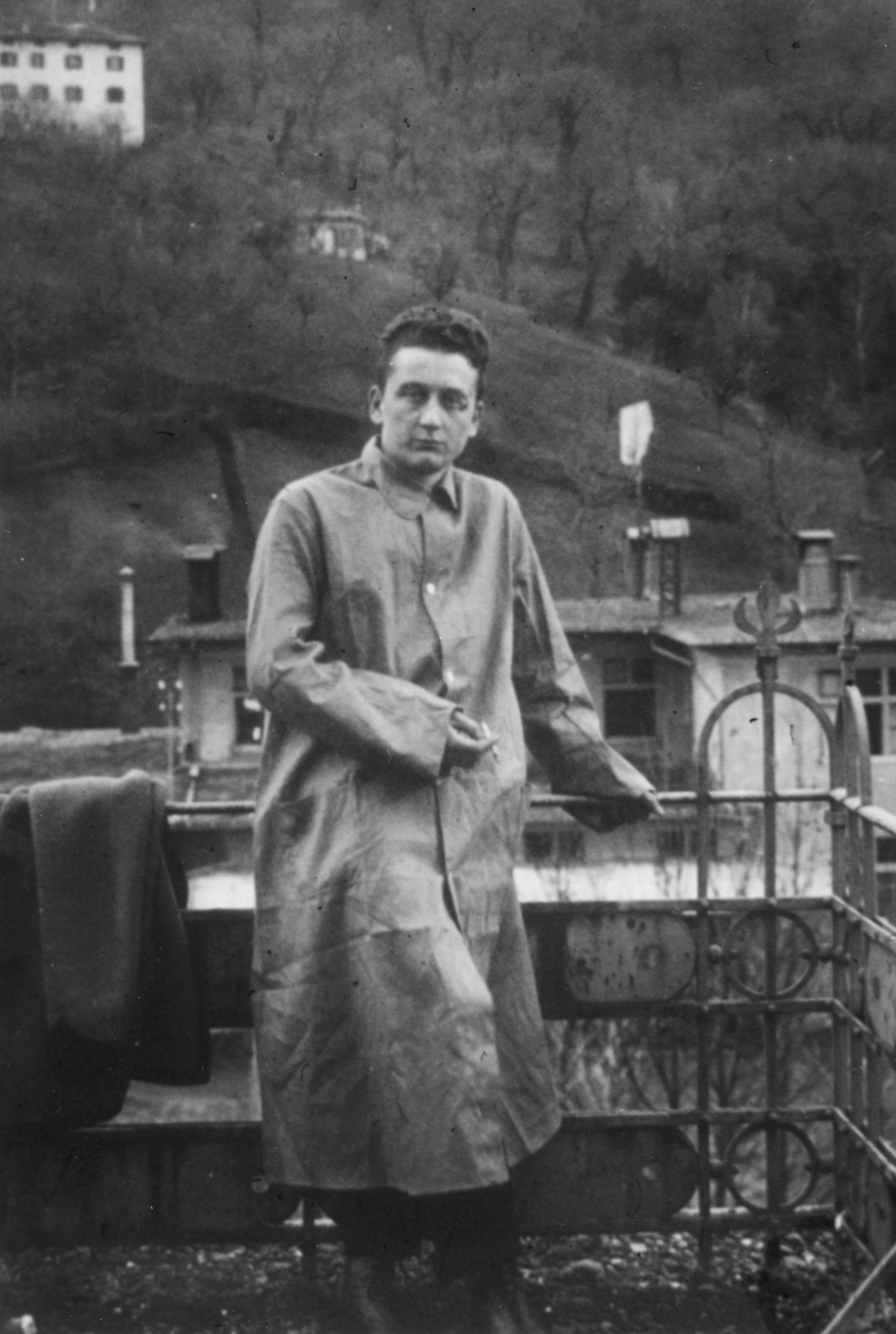
Szent-Györgyi in 1917 Italy

Szent-Györgyi began his studies at the Semmelweis University in 1911, and then began research in his uncle's anatomy lab. His studies were interrupted in 1914 to serve as an army medic in World War I. In 1916, disgusted with the war, Szent-Györgyi shot himself in the arm, claimed to be wounded from enemy fire, and was sent home on medical leave. He was then able to finish his medical education and received his MD in 1917. He married Kornélia Demény, the daughter of the Hungarian Postmaster General, that same year.

After the war, Szent-Györgyi began his research career in Bratislava, Slovakia. He switched universities several times over the next few years, finally ending up at the University of Groningen, where his work focused on the chemistry of cellular respiration. This work landed him a position as a Rockefeller Foundation fellow at the University of Cambridge. He received his PhD from the University of Cambridge in 1929 where he was a student at Fitzwilliam House, Cambridge. His research involved isolating an organic acid, which he then called "hexuronic acid", from adrenal gland tissue.

== Career and research ==
Szent-Györgyi accepted a position at the University of Szeged in Hungary in 1930. There Szent-Györgyi and his research fellow Joseph Svirbely found that "hexuronic acid" was actually the long-sought antiscorbutic factor, also known as vitamin C. After Walter Norman Haworth had determined its structure, the antiscorbutic was given the formal chemical name of L-ascorbic acid. In some experiments they used paprika as the source for their vitamin C. Also during this time, Szent-Györgyi continued his work on cellular respiration, identifying fumaric acid and other steps in what would become known as the Krebs cycle. In Szeged he also met Zoltán Bay, a physicist who became his friend and research partner in bio-physics.

In 1937 he received the Nobel Prize in Physiology or Medicine "for his discoveries in connection with the biological combustion process with special reference to vitamin C and the catalysis of fumaric acid". Albert Szent-Györgyi offered all of his Nobel prize money to Finland in 1940. (Hungarian volunteers in the Winter War travelled to fight for the Finns after the Soviet invasion of Finland in 1939.)

In 1938 he began work on the biophysics of muscle movement. He found that muscles contain actin, which when combined with the protein myosin and the energy source ATP, contract muscle fibers. In 1946, Albert received the Cameron Prize for Therapeutics of the University of Edinburgh.

In 1947 Szent-Györgyi established the Institute for Muscle Research at the Marine Biological Laboratory (MBL) in Woods Hole, Massachusetts with financial support from Hungarian businessman Stephen Rath. However, he still faced funding difficulties for several years due to his foreign status and former association with the Hungarian Communist government. In 1948, he received a research position with the National Institutes of Health (NIH) in Bethesda, Maryland and began dividing his time between there and Woods Hole. In 1950, grants from the Armour Meat Company and the American Heart Association allowed him to establish the Institute for Muscle Research at Woods Hole. Szent-Györgyi conducted research at the MBL from 1947 to 1986 year-round. There, he found that whole muscle tissue retained its contractility almost indefinitely if stored cold in a fifty percent glycerol solution, thus eliminating the need to have fresh muscle on hand.

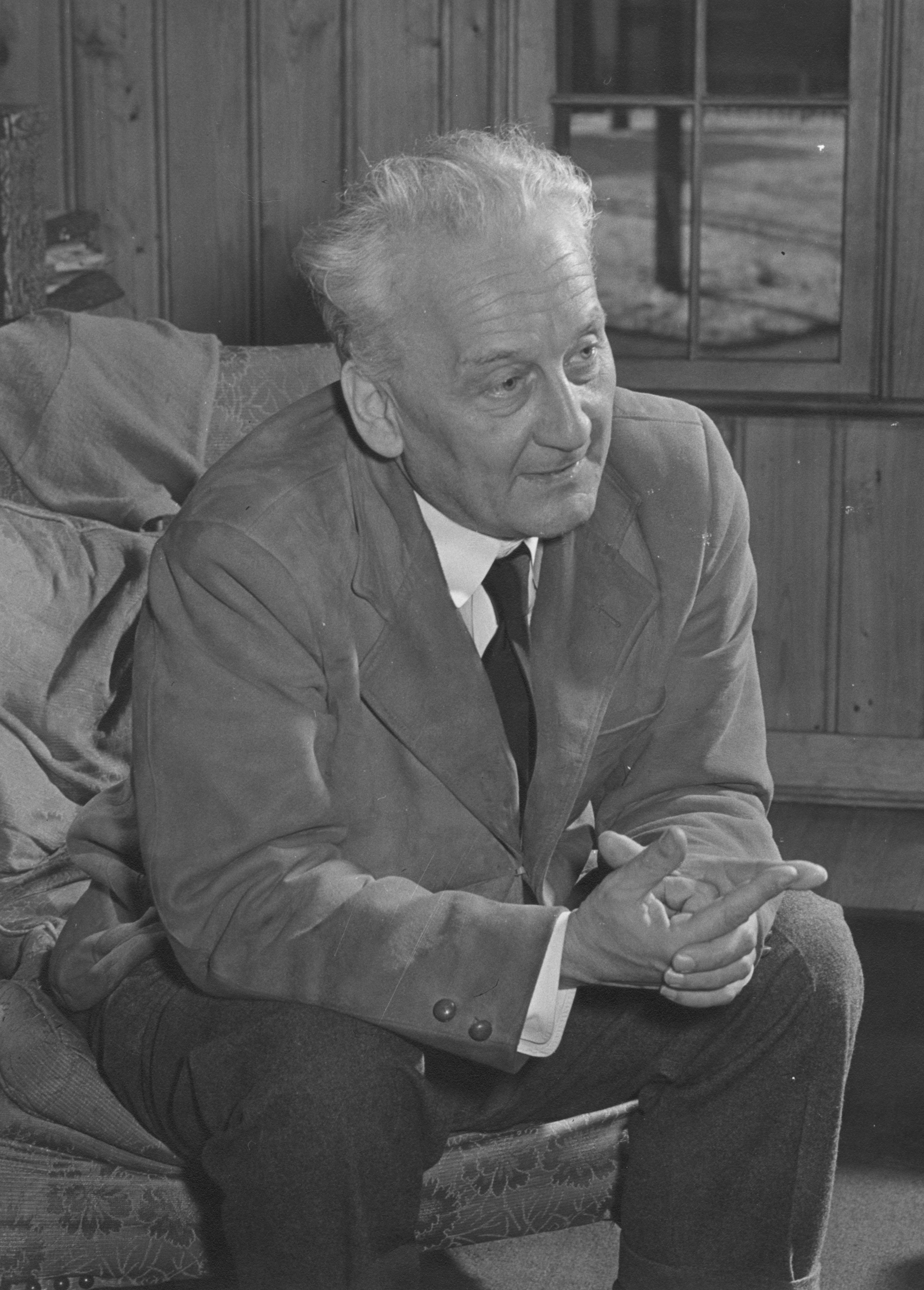
Szent-Györgyi in 1948

During the 1950s Szent-Györgyi began using electron microscopes to study muscles at the subunit level. He received the Lasker Award in 1954. In 1955, he became a naturalized citizen of the United States. He was elected to the National Academy of Sciences (NAS) in 1956.

In 1941, Szent-Györgyi developed a research interest in cancer and developed ideas on applying the theories of quantum mechanics to the biochemistry (quantum biology) of cancer. The death of Rath, who had acted as the financial administrator of the Institute for Muscle Research, left Szent-Györgyi in a financial mess. He refused to write government grant proposals minutely specifying his research methods and expected results. After Szent-Györgyi commented on his financial hardships in a 1971 newspaper interview, attorney Franklin Salisbury helped him establish a private nonprofit organization, the National Foundation for Cancer Research. Late in life, Szent-Györgyi began to pursue free radicals as a potential cause of cancer. He came to see cancer as being ultimately an electronic problem at the molecular level. In 1974, reflecting his interests in quantum physics, he proposed the term "syntropy" to replace "negentropy". Ralph Moss, a protégé during his cancer research years, wrote a biography, Free Radical: Albert Szent-Gyorgyi and the Battle over Vitamin C. Aspects of his work are an important precursor to the understanding of redox signaling.

=== Statement on scientific discovery ===
Albert Szent-Györgyi, who realized that "a discovery must be, by definition, at variance with existing knowledge," divided scientists into two categories: the Apollonians and the Dionysians. He called Dionysians the scientific dissenters who explore "the fringes of knowledge". He wrote, "In science the Apollonian tends to develop established lines to perfection, while the Dionysian rather relies on intuition and is more likely to open new, unexpected alleys for research...The future of mankind depends on the progress of science, and the progress of science depends on the support it can find. Support mostly takes the form of grants, and the present methods of distributing grants unduly favor the Apollonian."

=== Involvement in politics ===
As the government of Gyula Gömbös and the associated Hungarian National Defence Association gained control of politics in Hungary, Szent-Györgyi helped his Jewish friends escape from the country. During World War II, he joined the Hungarian resistance movement. Although Hungary was allied with the Axis powers, the Hungarian prime minister Miklós Kállay sent Szent-Györgyi to Istanbul in 1944 under the guise of a scientific lecture to begin secret negotiations with the Allies. The Germans learned of this plot and Adolf Hitler himself issued a warrant for the arrest of Szent-Györgyi. He escaped from house arrest and spent 1944 to 1945 as a fugitive from the Gestapo.

After the war, Szent-Györgyi had become well-recognized as a public figure and there was some speculation that he might become President of Hungary, should the Soviets permit it. Szent-Györgyi established a laboratory at the University of Budapest and became head of the biochemistry department there. He was elected a member of Parliament and helped re-establish the Academy of Sciences. Dissatisfied with the Communist rule of Hungary, he emigrated to the United States in 1947.

In 1967, Szent-Györgyi signed a letter declaring his intention to refuse to pay taxes as a means of protesting against the US war against Vietnam, and urging other people to take a similar stand.

He was one of the signatories of the agreement to convene a convention for drafting a world constitution. As a result, for the first time in human history, a World Constituent Assembly convened to draft and adopt a Constitution for the Federation of Earth.

=== Works online ===
- "Teaching and the Expanding Knowledge", in Rampart Journal of Individualist Thought, Vol. 1, No. 1 (March 1965). 24–28. (Reprinted from Science, Vol. 146, No. 3649 [December 4, 1964]. 1278–1279.)

=== Publications ===
- On Oxidation, Fermentation, Vitamins, Health, and Disease (1940)
- Bioenergetics (1957)
- Introduction to a Submolecular Biology (1960)
- The Crazy Ape (1970) ISBN 080652930X
- What next?! (1971) ISBN 0802220452
- Electronic Biology and Cancer: A New Theory of Cancer (1976)
- The living state (1972)
- Bioelectronics: a study in cellular regulations, defense and cancer
- Lost in the Twentieth Century (Gandu) (1963)

== Personal life ==
He married Cornelia Demény (1898–1981), daughter of the Hungarian Postmaster-General, in 1917. Their daughter, Cornelia Szent-Györgyi, was born in 1918 and died in 1969. He and Cornelia divorced in 1941.

In 1941, he wed Marta Borbiro Miskolczy. She died of cancer in 1963.

Szent-Györgyi married June Susan Wichterman, the 25-year-old daughter of Woods Hole biologist Ralph Wichterman, in 1965. They were divorced in 1968.

He married his fourth wife, Marcia Houston, in 1975. They adopted a daughter, Lola von Szent-Györgyi.

=== Death and legacy ===
Szent-Györgyi died in Woods Hole, Massachusetts, US, on October 22, 1986. He was honored with a Google Doodle September 16, 2011, 118 years after his birth. In 2004, nine interviews were conducted with family, colleagues, and others to create a Szent-Györgyi oral history collection.

== Bibliography ==
- US National Library of Medicine. The Albert Szent-Györgyi Papers.NIH Profiles in Science
- Ralph Moss (1988). Free Radical Albert Szent-Györgyi and the Battle over Vitamin C. Paragon House Publishers. ISBN 978-0-913729-78-6.
- Szolcsányi, János (October 2007). "[Memories of Albert Szent-Györgyi in 1943 about the beginning of his research and about his mentor, Géza Mansfeld]". Orvosi Hetilap. 148 (42): 2007–11. doi:10.1556/OH.2007.H2142. PMID 17932008.
- Juhász-Nagy, Sándor (March 2002). "[Albert Szent-Györgyi—biography of a free genius]". Orvosi Hetilap. 143 (12): 611–14. PMID 11963399.
- Vértes, L (December 2000). "[László Németh and Albert Szent-Györgyi. Honoring anniversaries]". Orvosi Hetilap. 141 (52): 2831–33. PMID 11202120.
- Manchester, K L (January 1998). "Albert Szent-Györgyi and the unravelling of biological oxidation". Trends Biochem. Sci. 23 (1): 37–40. doi:10.1016/S0968-0004(97)01167-5. PMID 9478135.
- Gábor, M (January 1996). "[Albert Szent-Györgyi and flavonoid research]". Orvosi Hetilap. 137 (2): 83–84. PMID 8721874.
- Nagy, I Z (1995). "Semiconduction of proteins as an attribute of the living state: the ideas of Albert Szent-Györgyi revisited in light of the recent knowledge regarding oxygen free radicals". Exp. Gerontol. 30 (3–4): 327–35. doi:10.1016/0531-5565(94)00043-3. PMID 7556511. S2CID 54230701.
- Zallár, A; Szabó T (April 1989). "Habent sua fata libelli: the adventurous story of Albert Szent-Györgyi's book entitled Studies on Muscle (1945)". Acta Physiol. Scand. 135 (4): 423–24. doi:10.1111/j.1748-1716.1989.tb08599.x. PMID 2660487.
- Szilárd, J (May 1988). "[The Nobel prize. (Pro memoria Albert Szent-Györgyi). The University of Szeged Medical School named after Albert Szent-Györgyi]". Orvosi Hetilap. 129 (18): 949–50. PMID 3290769.
- Szabó, T; Zallár A; Zallár I (1988). "Albert Szent-Györgyi in Szeged". Geographia Medica. 18: 153–56. PMID 3049243.
- Banga, I (January 1987). "[In memory of Albert Szent-Györgyi]". Orvosi Hetilap. 128 (2): 97–98. PMID 3547244.
- Cohen, S S (1987). "Thoughts on the later career of Albert Szent-Gyorgyi". Acta Biochim. Biophys. Hung. 22 (2–3): 141–48. PMID 3118622.
- Straub, F B (1987). "The charismatic teacher at Szeged: Albert Szent-Györgyi". Acta Biochim. Biophys. Hung. 22 (2–3): 135–39. PMID 3118621.
- "[Salute to the 90-year old Albert Szent-Györgyi]". Orvosi Hetilap. 124 (40): 2435–36. October 1983. PMID 6369221.
- Bendiner, E (May 1982). "Albert Szent-Györgyi: the art in being wrong". Hospital Practice (Hospital Ed.). 17 (5): 179–84, 185–86, 192. doi:10.1080/21548331.1982.11702318. PMID 7044943.
- Szállási, A (February 1980). "[Albert Szent-Györgyi in the journal Nyugat]". Orvosi Hetilap. 121 (8): 468. PMID 6992048.
- Holden, C (February 1979). "Albert-Szent-Györgyi, electrons, and cancer". Science. 203 (4380): 522–24. Bibcode:1979Sci...203..522H. doi:10.1126/science.366748. PMID 366748.
- Süle, T (December 1977). "[Albert Szent-Györgyi in Hungarian numismatics]". Orvosi Hetilap. 118 (52): 3170–71. PMID 341025.
- Szállási, A (November 1977). "[Albert Szent-Györgyi was awarded the Nobel Prize 40 years ago]". Orvosi Hetilap. 118 (46): 2782–83. PMID 335333.
- Kardos, I (1975). "A talk with Albert Szent-Györgyi". The New Hungarian Quarterly. 16 (57): 136–50. PMID 11635455.
- Szállási, A (December 1974). "[2 interesting early articles by Albert Szent-Györgyi]". Orvosi Hetilap. 115 (52): 3118–19. PMID 4612454.
- Kenéz, J (December 1973). "[Eventful life of a scientist. 80th birthday of Nobel prize winner Albert Szent-Györgyi]". Münchener Medizinische Wochenschrift. 115 (51): 2324–26. PMID 4589872.
- Miura, Y (December 1969). "[Doctor Albert von Szent-Gyoergyi]". Nippon Ishikai Zasshi. Journal of the Japan Medical Association. 62 (11): 1164–68. PMID 4903813.
- Kenéz, J (December 1968). "[Albert Szent-Györgyi is 75 years old]". Orvosi Hetilap. 109 (50): 2777–81. PMID 4887815.
- Sulek, K (May 1968). "[Nobel prize for Albert Szant-Györgyi in 1937 for studies on the metabolic processes, particularly of vitamin C and catalysis of fumaric acid]". Wiad. Lek. 21 (10): 911. PMID 4875831.
- Ilona Újszászi (ed.): The intellectual heritage of Albert Szent-Györgyi = Szegedi Egyetemi Tudástár 2.(Series editors.: László Dux, István Hannus, József Pál, Ilona Újszászi) Publishing Department-University of Szeged. 2014. ISBN 978-963-306-347-7
- László Dux: On the Basics of Biochemistry. In: The intellectual heritage of Albert Szent-Györgyi = Szegedi Egyetemi Tudástár 2.(Series editors.: László Dux, István Hannus, József Pál, Ilona Újszászi) Publishing Department-University of Szeged. 2014. 13–23. ISBN 978-963-306-347-7
- János Wölfling: Life through the eyes of a chemist. In: The intellectual heritage of Albert Szent-Györgyi = Szegedi Egyetemi Tudástár 2.(Series editors.: László Dux, István Hannus, József Pál, Ilona Újszászi) Publishing Department-University of Szeged. 2014. 24–34. ISBN 978-963-306-347-7
- Gábor Tóth: From vitamins to peptides - Research topics in Szent-Györgyi's departments. In: The intellectual heritage of Albert Szent-Györgyi = Szegedi Egyetemi Tudástár 2.(Series editors.: László Dux, István Hannus, József Pál, Ilona Újszászi) Publishing Department-University of Szeged. 2014. 35–57. ISBN 978-963-306-347-7
- István Hannus: The Analysis of Vitamin C in Szeged. In: The intellectual heritage of Albert Szent-Györgyi = Szegedi Egyetemi Tudástár 2.(Series editors.: László Dux, István Hannus, József Pál, Ilona Újszászi) Publishing Department-University of Szeged. 2014. 58–76. ISBN 978-963-306-347-7
- Mária Homoki-Nagy: Protection of the creations of the mind in the history of Hungarian law. Copyright and patent rights; primacy and ethics in science. In: The intellectual heritage of Albert Szent-Györgyi = Szegedi Egyetemi Tudástár 2.(Series editors.: László Dux, István Hannus, József Pál, Ilona Újszászi) Publishing Department-University of Szeged. 2014. 77–93. ISBN 978-963-306-347-7
- Miklós Gábor: Albert Szent-Györgyi's Studies on Flavones. Impact of the Discovery. In: The intellectual heritage of Albert Szent-Györgyi = Szegedi Egyetemi Tudástár 2.(Series editors.: László Dux, István Hannus, József Pál, Ilona Újszászi) Publishing Department-University of Szeged. 2014. 94-122. ISBN 978-963-306-347-7
- Tamás Vajda: Effects of the discovery of vitamin C on the paprika industry and the economy of the southern part of the Hungarian Great Plain. In: The intellectual heritage of Albert Szent-Györgyi = Szegedi Egyetemi Tudástár 2.(Series editors.: László Dux, István Hannus, József Pál, Ilona Újszászi) Publishing Department-University of Szeged. 2014. 123–152. ISBN 978-963-306-347-7
- Béla Pukánszky: The thoughts of Albert Szent-Györgyi on pedagogy. In: The intellectual heritage of Albert Szent-Györgyi = Szegedi Egyetemi Tudástár 2.(Series editors.: László Dux, István Hannus, József Pál, Ilona Újszászi) Publishing Department-University of Szeged. 2014. 153–169. ISBN 978-963-306-347-7
- Csaba Jancsák: Albert Szent-Györgyi and the Student Union of the University of Szeged. In: The intellectual heritage of Albert Szent-Györgyi = Szegedi Egyetemi Tudástár 2.(Series editors.: László Dux, István Hannus, József Pál, Ilona Újszászi) Publishing Department-University of Szeged. 2014. 170–193. ISBN 978-963-306-347-7
- József Pál: From the Unity of Life to the Coequality of the Forms of Consciousness. Worries of Albert Szent-Györgyi in Times of War. In: The intellectual heritage of Albert Szent-Györgyi = Szegedi Egyetemi Tudástár 2.(Series editors.: László Dux, István Hannus, József Pál, Ilona Újszászi) Publishing Department-University of Szeged. 2014. 194–210. ISBN 978-963-306-347-7 http://publicatio.bibl.u-szeged.hu/6615/1/Sz_Gy-Unity_of_life.pdf
- Ildikó Tasiné Csúcs: The science-rescuing activity of Albert Szent-Györgyi and its roots in Hungary after 1945. In: The intellectual heritage of Albert Szent-Györgyi = Szegedi Egyetemi Tudástár 2.(Series editors.: László Dux, István Hannus, József Pál, Ilona Újszászi) Publishing Department-University of Szeged. 2014. 211–227. ISBN 978-963-306-347-7 https://publicatio.bibl.u-szeged.hu/5744/1/Science_rescuing.pdf
- József Pál: About Albert Szent-Györgyi's Poems. In: The intellectual heritage of Albert Szent-Györgyi = Szegedi Egyetemi Tudástár 2.(Series editors.: László Dux, István Hannus, József Pál, Ilona Újszászi) Publishing Department-University of Szeged. 2014. 228–237. ISBN 978-963-306-347-7 https://web.archive.org/web/20160506215625/http://publicatio.bibl.u-szeged.hu/6611/1/A_Sz-Gy_poems.pdf
- Gábor Szabó: The passage of Szent-Györgyi to biophysics: a journey from the blur of the boundaries of disciplines through the instruments used for research with a stopover at the paprika centrifuge and arriving at the super lasers. In: The intellectual heritage of Albert Szent-Györgyi = Szegedi Egyetemi Tudástár 2.(Series editors.: László Dux, István Hannus, József Pál, Ilona Újszászi) Publishing Department-University of Szeged. 2014. 238–253. ISBN 978-963-306-347-7
