= Finnish–Estonian defence cooperation =

International relationship

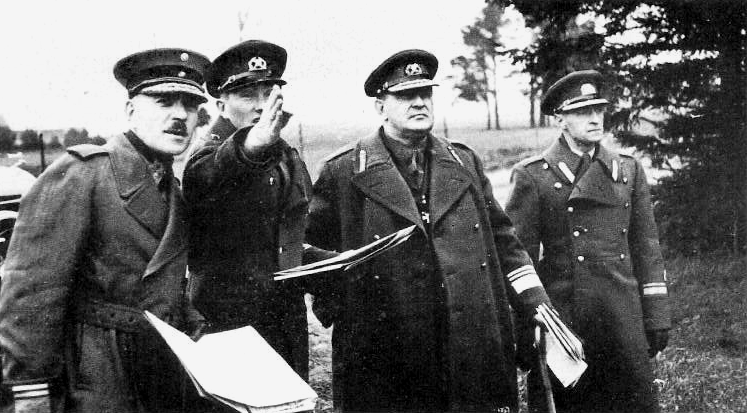
The Finnish Chief of the General Staff Lennart Oesch (left) monitors Estonian army military exercises in October 1938. The Estonian Chief of the General Staff, Nikolai Reek is second from the right.

Finnish–Estonian defence co-operation began in 1930 with a secret military pact between Finland and Estonia against the threat of the Soviet Union. Open co-operation ended in 1939, as the Soviets pressured the Estonian government, but it continued secretly with information-sharing during the Winter War.

== Background ==
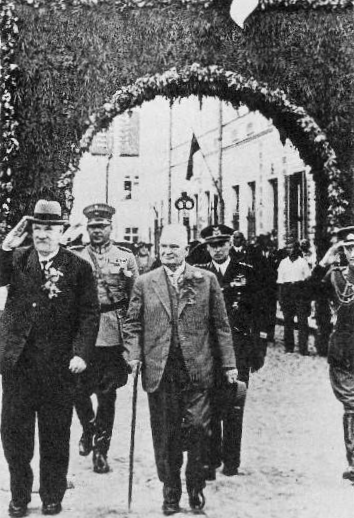
President of Finland Pehr Evind Svinhufvud (left) and President of Estonia Konstantin Päts (middle) in the city of Narva in 1936. State visits were scheduled every year. The most important negotiating issue was military co-operation.

The origins of defence co-operation lay in the Baltic Entente of the 1920s. Practical co-operation began with the initiative of the Finnish general staff in February 1930 in Tallinn and the first joint war games were held in 1933. Officially, both countries were neutral, but behind the scenes, the relationship was more complex. Nazi Germany, for example, unsuccessfully offered Estonia a secret military alliance in 1937.

Finland started co-operation only for its own defensive reasons though both countries speak Finnic languages and are neighbours. There were defence plans involving Finland launching a massive assault against Leningrad if the Soviet Union started a war against both countries. However, the plan would also have required the participation of Latvia, and according to the Finnish military leader, Carl Gustaf Emil Mannerheim, the countries would have needed outside help from the League of Nations. Finland could not send troops directly to the Baltic countries, but a joint assault would have been possible through the Karelian Isthmus and/or from Poland.

== Gulf of Finland blockade plan ==
Before the 1930s, defence co-operation between Finland, Poland, Estonia, Lithuania and Latvia was based on the Edge State Policy. In the 1930s, co-operation decreased, as Finland and Estonia started practical military dialogue. Both the Finnish policy of neutrality and the official trend in the Nordic countries kept the co-operation pact secret.

The Nordic trend did not officially allow Swedish participation in managing the security of the Gulf of Finland. However, behind the scenes, the general staffs of Sweden and Finland had secretly negotiated a plan in 1929 to blockade the Gulf. Sweden agreed that it would first suggest the blockade plan to Estonia in 1930. Officially, Sweden would not participate in co-operation, but it would supply materiel and auxiliary troops if the Soviet Union attacked.

== Coastal artillery ==
Practical measures by Finland and Estonia were based upon Peter the Great's Naval Fortress system, allowing surface ships and coastal artillery fire to prevent possible movements of the Soviet Baltic Fleet. After the Imperial Russian Baltic fleet was mostly destroyed in the Russo-Japanese War of 1905, Russia sought to replace the loss of fleet vessels from 1912 onwards by reinforcing the coastal artillery on the shores of the Gulf of Finland. The aim was to build a barrage against the German fleet's potential intrusion along the Gulf to Saint Petersburg, then capital of Russia. Coastal arrays of 12-inch naval guns were installed on both sides of the Gulf.

The defence co-operation aimed to prevent access by Soviet vessels through the Gulf to Helsinki and Tallinn using mines, coastal artillery fire and submarines. As a result, Finland redeveloped its heavy coastal artillery and fortresses, adapting 305 mm shells to give them greater range, thus providing complete artillery coverage between Mäkiluoto in Finland and Naissaar in Estonia. The first joint military exercise was held in 1936.

== Submarines ==
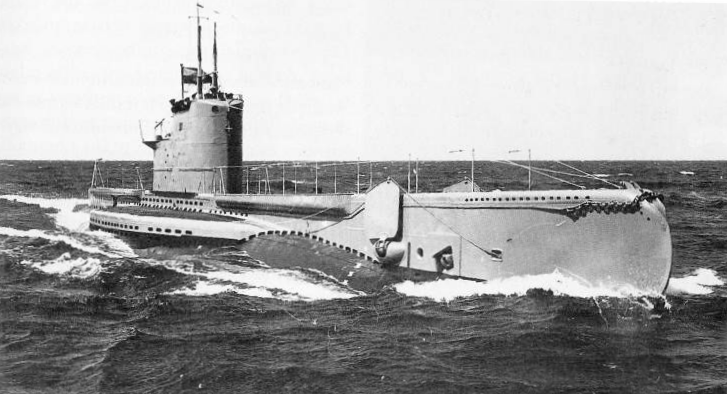
The Estonian submarines Kalev and Lembit were both manufactured in the United Kingdom and began their service in spring 1937.

The joint deployment of submarines was a part of the Gulf blockade plan. The Estonian submarine programme was expensive; the Estonian Navy even had to sell two destroyers in 1933 to be able to finance the two new submarines it launched in 1937. Estonian submarines installed the same kind of torpedoes and mines as their Finnish counterparts, and Estonian naval officers were trained in Finnish submarines.

== Radio intelligence and the Winter War ==
During the Winter War, Estonia was formally neutral, but it had to allow the Soviet Union to establish military bases and station troops on its soil. From the military bases, the Soviet Union carried out bombing raids on Finland.

As part of the coastal artillery co-operation, the countries had a common fire management system linked by an undersea radio cable. The Estonians had earlier managed to decipher the Soviet secret radio code, and they had access to military radio communications. During the Winter War, Estonian military staff gave the Finns top secret information on Soviet troop movements.

== Aftermath ==
The Finnish–Estonian defence pact remained secret for decades and did not come to light until the Estonian and Russian archives were opened in the 1990s. Finnish archives on the matter had been transported outside the country or destroyed after the Continuation War.

== See also ==
- Coastal batteries of Estonia
- Military history of Finland
- Military history of Estonia
- Finnish Navy
- Estonian–Finnish federation
