= Finnish minelayer Ruotsinsalmi =

Minelayer of the Finnish Navy commissioned in 1940

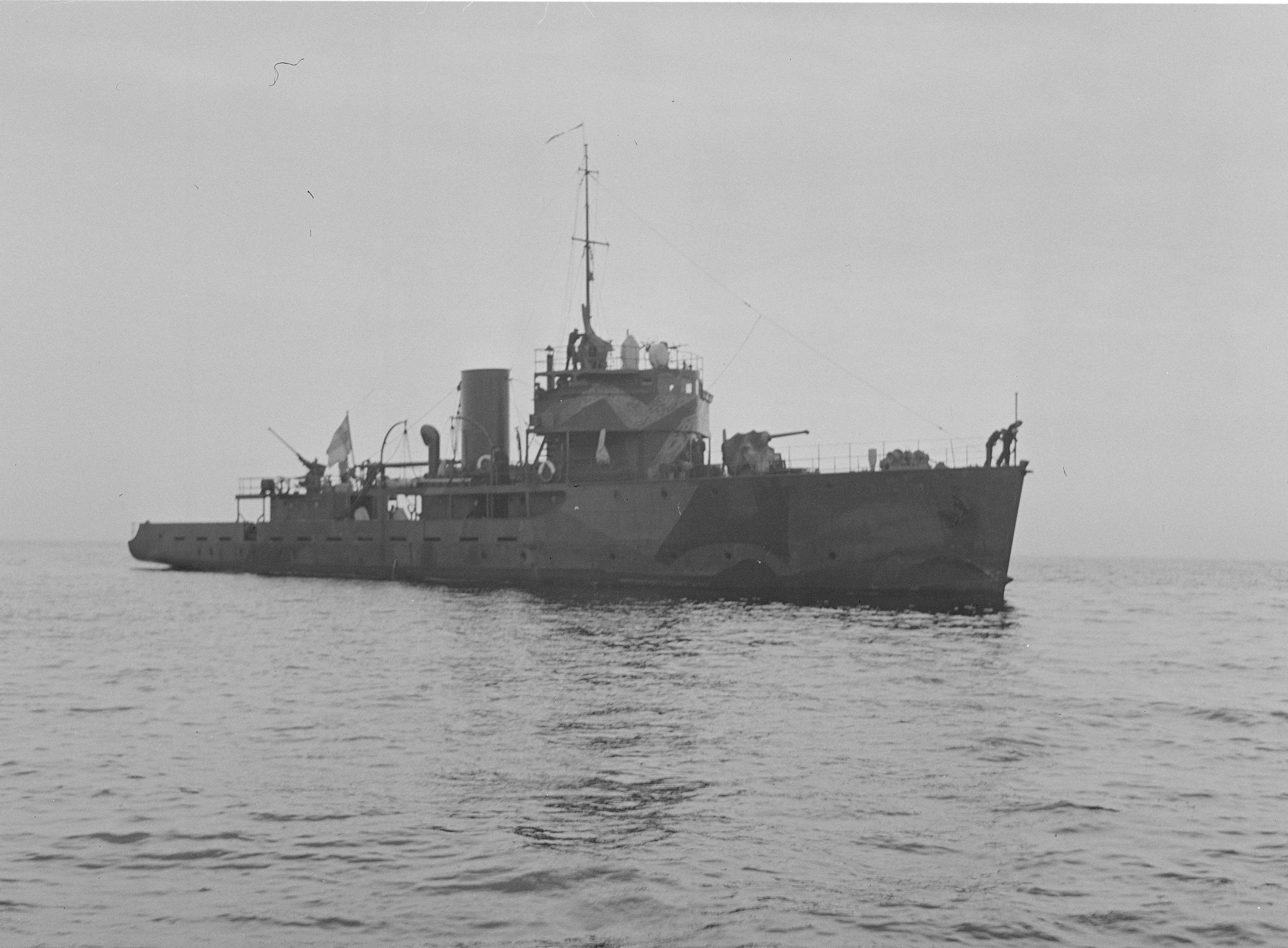
- Ruotsinsalmi

History

Finland
- Name: Ruotsinsalmi
- Namesake: Battle of Ruotsinsalmi (1790)
- Builder: Wärtsilä Crichton-Vulcan, Turku
- Launched: October 1940
- Commissioned: 1941
- Decommissioned: 1975
- Fate: Decommissioned in 1975, scrapped in the 1990s

General characteristics
- Class & type: Ruotsinsalmi-class minelayer
- Displacement: 310 t
- Length: 50.0 m (164 ft 1 in)
- Beam: 7.9 m (25 ft 11 in)
- Draught: 1.5 m (4 ft 11 in)
- Propulsion: 2 × Rateau diesel (835 kW (1,120 hp)); later; 2 × MAN diesel (894 kW (1,199 hp))
- Speed: 15 knots (28 km/h; 17 mph)
- Armament: [design]; 1× 75 mm gun; 1× 40 mm Bofors gun; 2× 20 mm Madsen anti-aircraft cannons; depth charge launchers; 3× rails for 100 mines; Smoke screen generators

Ruotsinsalmi was a minelayer of the Finnish Navy and the namesake of her class. Ruotsinsalmi was commissioned in 1940 and remained in service until 1975. The vessel was named after the Battle of Ruotsinsalmi, which was fought between Sweden and Russia in 1790.

== New minelayers for the navy ==
Funding for two new minelayers had been secured as early as in 1937, but instead the money was used to refurbish the garrison at Mäkiluoto.

Ruotsinsalmi and her sister vessel, Riilahti, were intended as escort minesweepers for the Finnish navy's coastal defence ships Ilmarinen and Väinämöinen, and they were therefore designed with a draught of only 1.5 metres (4 ft 11 in). Ruotsinsalmi was armed with one 75-millimetre (3.0 in) gun, one Bofors 40 mm guns and two Madsen 20 mm anti-aircraft cannons. The vessel had three mine dropping rails, and could carry about 100 mines. The ship could also hunt submarines, and was equipped with sonar, depth charge throwers and rails. The vessel was also strong enough to be able to tow mine sweeping equipment. It was equipped with smoke generators so it could protect itself and other near-by vessels from the enemy.

== During the Continuation War ==
Ruotsinsalmi and Riilahti began mining the Gulf of Finland on 26 June 1941, immediately after the outbreak of the Continuation War. The first minefield, Kipinola, Ruotsinsalmi laid together with Riilahti south-east of Hanko which was intended to block Soviet seaways to Hanko. Same group laid already on 27 June the next minefield, Kuolemajärvi, north-west of Paldiski again to block route to Hanko. Another one, Valkjärvi, was laid on 29–30 June.

Minefields laid by Ruotsinsalmi in 1941
| Date | Mines | Location | Laid by |
|---|---|---|---|
| 26 June | 200 contact mines | SE of Hanko | Riilahti; Ruotsinsalmi |
| 27.6. | 200 contact mines | NE of Osmussaar | Riilahti; Ruotsinsalmi |
| 30.6. | 200 contact mines | NE of Juminda | Riilahti; Ruotsinsalmi |
| 21.7. | 85 contact mines; 15 anti-sweep obstacles | N of Mohni | Ruotsinsalmi |
| 10.8. | 201 contact mines | NE of Juminda | Riilahti; Ruotsinsalmi |
| 11.8. | 195 contact mines | NE of Juminda | Riilahti; Ruotsinsalmi |
| 13.8. | 200 contact mines | NE of Juminda | Riilahti; Ruotsinsalmi |
| 12.11. | 139 contact mines | SSE of Helsinki | Riilahti; Ruotsinsalmi |

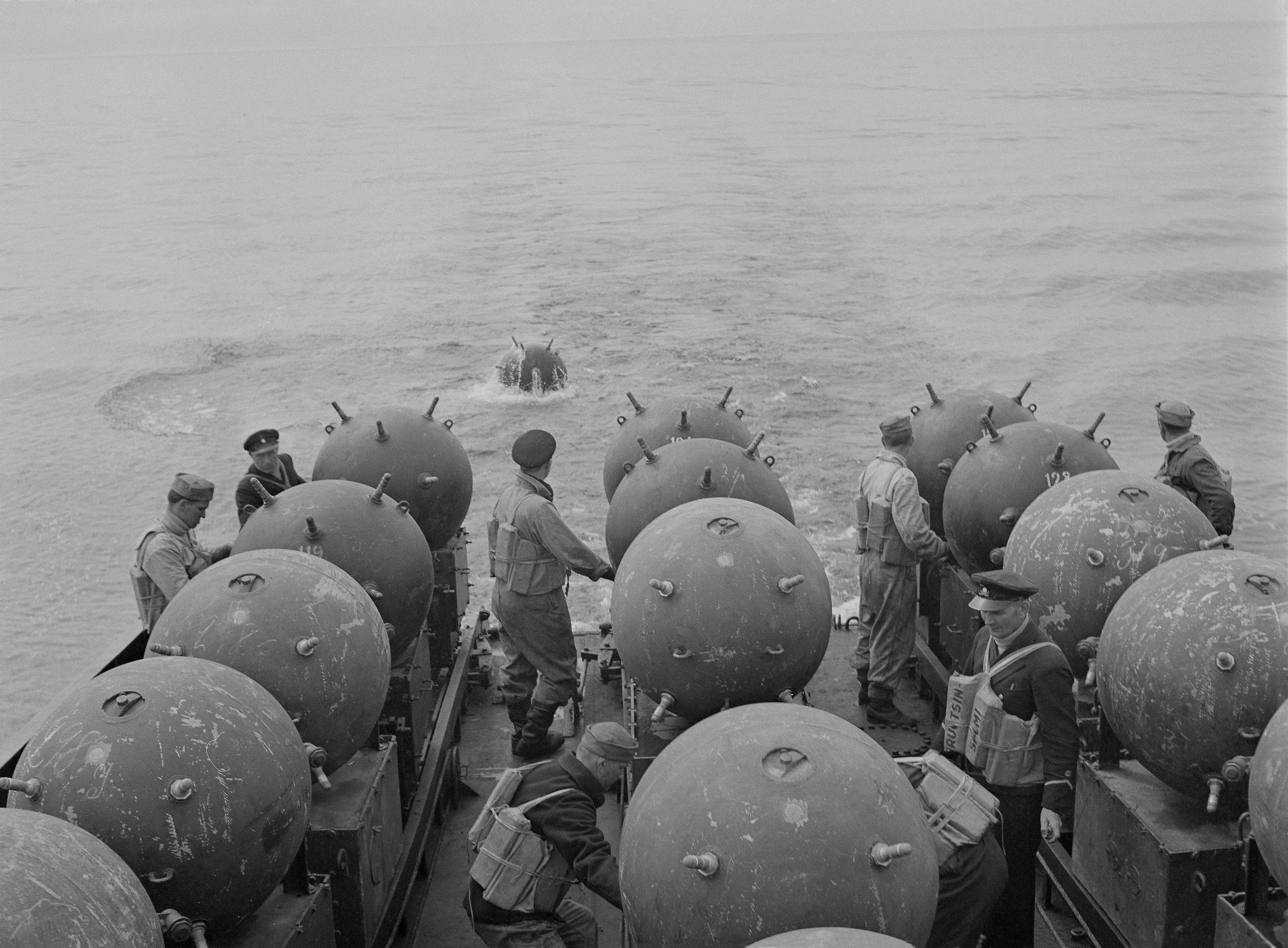
Minelaying operations aboard Ruotsinsalmi in May 1942

Ruotsinsalmi together with Riilahti participated in ferrying the Finnish gunboats past Hanko in August 1941. After two failed attempts by gunboats to rendezvous with minelayers on the nights of 25-26 and 27–28 August the minelayers penetrated the Soviet minefield and met with the gunboats west of Hanko and then escorted them through to Helsinki on 29 August 1941.

Ruotsinsalmi again with Riilahti were sent on 21 November to as minesweeping escorts for convoy of German ships consisting of two tugs and a depot ship headed to west through the Soviet minebarrier south of Hanko. However, in the dark the convoy deviated from the swept route and as the sweeping gear became entangled with mines it had stop. Before the convoy managed to resume its journey, tug Föhn slipped outside the swept area and sank after hitting a mine but the rest of the convoy reached its destination. The voyage back through the minebarrier with a convoy of freighters started at midnight of 3 December after the escort group had been strengthened with German minesweepers M 4 and M 7 and it took place without any incidents.

Ruotsinsalmi was Finland's most active minelayer during the Second World War, laying a total of 3,967 sea mines and 541 sweeping obstacles. She was forced to lay mines against the Germans after the end of the hostilities with the Soviet Union in an attempt to hinder German submarine activity.

She participated in the sinking of one Soviet submarine Shch-408 on 25 May 1943 (along with VMV 6).

== After the war ==
Ruotsinsalmi had proven to be a sound design and well suited for its task. However, it continued to serve a number of different missions after the war. The ship ended its career as a diving support vessel (1973–1975). She was mothballed in Upinniemi, and there were plans to make her into a museum, but she was scrapped at the beginning of the 1990s, after the owners had failed to gather enough funds.
