= Peter the Great's Naval Fortress =

Russian fortification line

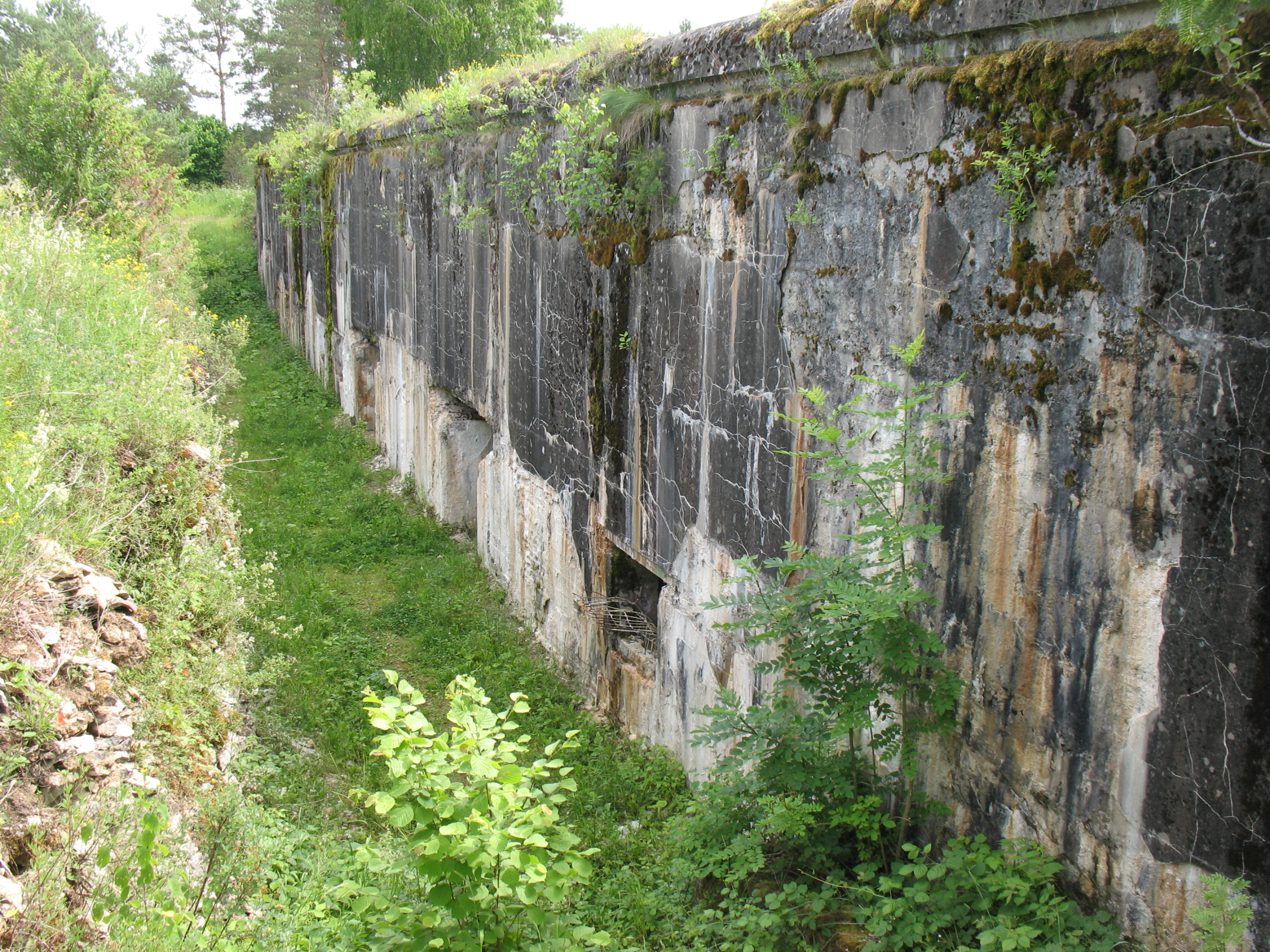
- Remains of the fortress
- Interactive map of Peter the Great's Naval Fortress
- 59.459617°N 24.394678°E

History
- Built: 1912–1917

Site notes
- Area: Estonia, Finland

Peter the Great's Naval Fortress or the Tallinn-Porkkala defence station was a Russian fortification line, which aimed to block access to the Russian capital Saint Petersburg via the sea. The plans for the fortress included heavy coastal artillery pieces along the northern and southern shores of the Gulf of Finland. The emphasis was put on the defenses of the gulf's narrowest point, between Porkkala, (in current day Finland) and Tallinn, (in current day Estonia). This was a strategic point, as the two fortresses of Mäkiluoto and Naissaar were only 36 kilometres (22 mi) apart. The coastal artillery had a range of about 25 km (16 mi) and could thus "close" the gap between the shores, trapping enemy ships in a crossfire. Furthermore, a new major naval base was constructed in Tallinn.

== Purpose ==
The decision to start construction of the naval fortress line came after the disastrous events at Tsushima, where the whole Russian Baltic Fleet had been annihilated. The road to Saint Petersburg was then unprotected and open. The quickest and cheapest way of dealing with this problem was to protect Saint Petersburg with a seemingly impenetrable zone of coastal artillery until a new fleet had been constructed. The idea was presented for the first time in 1907. Czar Nicholas II approved the plans on 5 July 1912, and the construction began soon thereafter.

== Defensive lines ==
The system consisted of several zones of defence:

1. The innermost zone consisted of the fortresses at Kronstadt, Krasnaya Gorka and Ino, and the land and coastal fortresses near Vyborg. The latter were to prevent the enemy circling the Kronstadt line by landing near the Bay of Vyborg.
2. The second line was between Kotka and Narva, following the between-lying islands.
3. The third and main line of defence was between Tallinn and Porkkala.
4. The fourth line was between Hiiumaa and the Hanko Peninsula.

Further, Helsinki and Tallinn were encircled with defensive lines on land, consisting of thousands of kilometers of railway, bunkers connected with tunnel systems, and cannon fire positions. The Krepost Sveaborg fortification system around Helsinki was centered on the Sveaborg Fortress (Suomenlinna).

The construction of the defensive system was slowed due to the outbreak of World War I. The naval fortress was only partly finished when both Finland and Estonia declared their independence, following the Russian October Revolution. The German Navy performed one major landing operation on the shores of the Gulf of Finland during World War I. In April 1918, following a request from the Senate of Vaasa in Finland, the German Ostsee Division, led by Rüdiger von der Goltz, landed in Hanko, joined the Finnish Whites in the fight against the Reds, and conquered Helsinki.

== The heavy batteries of the Tallinn-Porkkala line ==
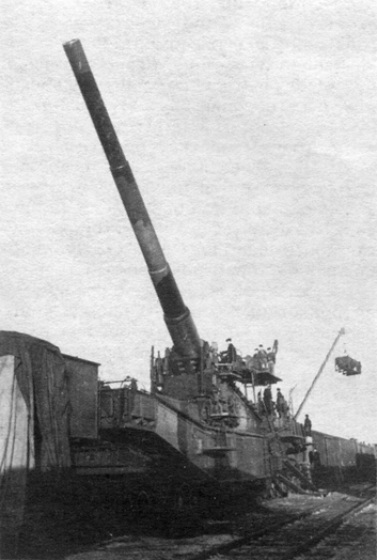
356 mm TM-1-14 railroad gun in WWII

The heaviest batteries were supposed to consist of 356 mm/52 m 1913 guns. However, at the time of the Russian Revolution of 1917, these were still under construction and were not finished.

- Mäkiluoto:
  - 4x 203 mm/50 VC
- Naissaar:
  - 4x 305 mm/52 O
  - 4x 234 mm/50 Be
  - 4x 203 mm/50 VC
  - 4x 152 mm/45 C
  - 3x 120 mm/50 V
- Aegna:
  - 2x 305/52 O
- Viimsi
  - 4x 120/50 V
- Suurupi:
  - 4x 234/50 Be
- Kakumägi
  - 3x 120/50 V

== Aftermath ==
In the 1930s, the Finnish and Estonian coastal defenses made extensive plans to use the fortresses against their former masters, and prevent the Soviet Baltic Fleet from gaining access to the seas. The defense would be strengthened by minefields and patrolling submarines from the Finnish and Estonian navies. These plans were however nullified with the Soviet demands of air and naval bases in the Baltic States in 1939.

The fortress in Porkkala, along with its 305 mm guns was leased to the Soviet Union in the Moscow Armistice of 1944. When the territory was returned to Finland in 1956, the guns were demolished.

== See also ==
- Finnish–Estonian defense cooperation

== Sources ==
- Leskinen, Jari (1999). Veljien valtiosalaisuus — Suomen ja Viron salainen sotilaallinen yhteistyö Neuvostoliiton hyökkäyksen varalle vuosina 1918–1940. Werner Söderström osakeyhtiö. ISBN 951-0-23828-7.
- Enqvist, Ove (1999). Itsenäisen Suomen rannikkotykit 1918–1998. Sotamuseo. ISBN 951-25-1033-2.
