= Väinö Valve =

Finnish general and navy commander

Väinö Lahja Richard Valve
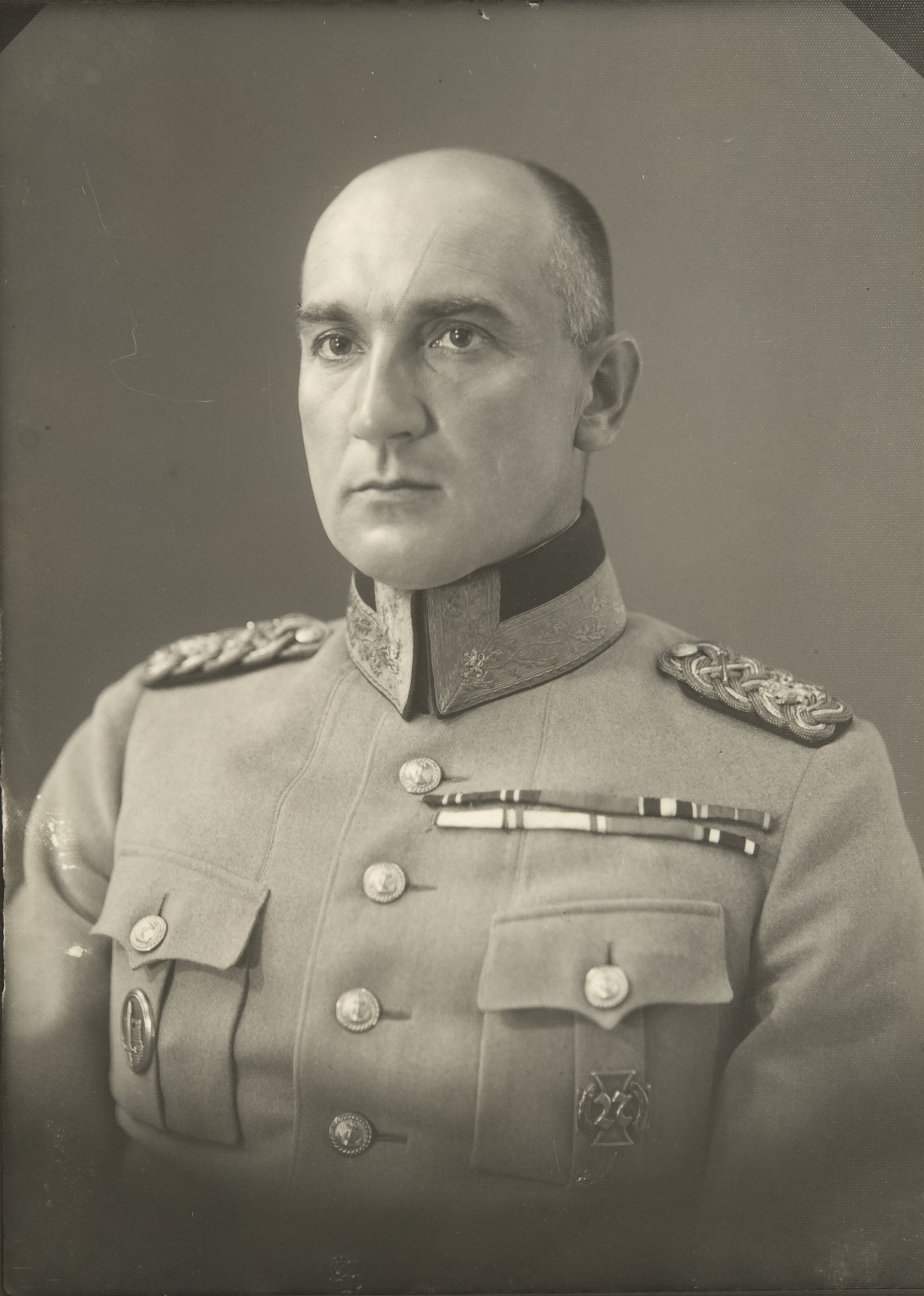
- Major general Väinö Valve in 1932.
- Born: Väinö Lahja Richard Vähätupa; 28 December 1895; Lappeenranta, Grand Duchy of Finland
- Died: 11 March 1995 (aged 99); Helsinki, Finland
- Spouses: 1921–1948: Margareta (Greta) Helena née Cornér (1884–1968); 1949→: Aili Aune née Haahti (1907–1996)
- Military career
- Allegiance: German Empire; Finland
- Branch: Finnish Jäger troops, Finnish Army
- Rank: Lieutenant (Germany); General (Finland 1992)
- Commands: Heavy Artillery Regiment (1918–1924); Coastal Artillery (1924–1927); Finnish Navy (1933–1946)
- Conflicts: World War I Finnish Civil War; World War II
- Awards: → awards

Commander of the Finnish Navy
- In office 1933–1946
- Preceded by: Arvo Aleksander Wirta
- Succeeded by: Svante Sundman

Defence minister of Finland Paasikivi II Cabinet
- In office 1 December 1944 – 17 April 1945
- President: C.G.E. Mannerheim
- Prime Minister: J.K. Paasikivi
- Preceded by: Rudolf Walden
- Succeeded by: Mauno Pekkala

Väinö Lahja Richard Valve (until 1915 Vähätupa; 28 December 1895 – 11 March 1995) was a Finnish general, navy commander and the last living member of the Royal Prussian Jägerbattalion 27 formed from Finnish volunteers.

Valve studied seven years in Lappeenranta and after completing middle school, he worked in apprenticeship, until went to study electrical engineering in Tampere. In 1916 he joined to Jäger Movement and travelled secretly to Germany. He was in military training until 1918 until he travelled as an officer to newly independent Finland and fought in the Finnish Civil War together with other jägers.

In the 1920s Valve's military career was in upswing; he commanded first the coastal artillery and in 1933 he became commander of the Finnish Navy, including the coastal artillery. Valve took part at developing military co-operation with Estonia. The Second World War interrupted Valve's masterminded navy development plan, which had been approved just shortly before. During the Second World War the coastal artillery performed well in the Winter War and in the Continuation War Valve organised navy co-operation with the German Kriegsmarine. After Finland made armistice with the Soviet Union, the navy took part in Lapland War in which the objective was driving off German troops from the country.

Valve was defence minister of Finland in 1944–1945. He left army in 1946 as lieutenant general and made career in banking. He took actively part in jäger association activities.

Valve was promoted general in 1992. He died in 1995 as the last Finnish jäger.

== Early life and studies ==
Valve was born in Lappeenranta as Väinö Vähätupa. His parents were from Finland Proper; the father, Matti Vähätupa, worked as farrier in Finnish Dragoon Regiment and later he started his own business in Lappee. Väinö had six siblings. He studied in Lappeenranta coeducational middle school until 17-year old. He was interested in electrical engineering and went for apprenticeship first to Helsinki City Electricity Works, then to Imperial Russian Navy in Katajanokka and after that to State Railways repair depot. In 1914 Väinö Vähätupa started electrical engineering studies in Tampere Technical School.

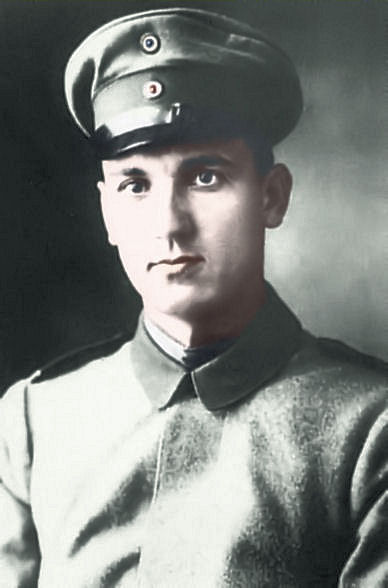
Jaeger Väinö Valve.

== Jäger Movement ==
In 1915 Vähätupa changed his surname to Valve, 'awake'. He interrupted his studies in late winter 1916, when he decided secretly to join to the Jäger Movement, following example of many of his fellow students. He skied over frozen Kvarken to Sweden and arrived in Lockstedt camp in Germany on 1 May. The Royal Prussian Jägerbattalion 27 was formed from the Finnish volunteers. Valve was ordered to join artillery and in November he was sent to east front at Gulf of Riga. Valve served in howitzer battery of the battalion in 1916–1917. Following the service at the front, he was sent to Libau for training and promoted to lieutenant. Subsequently, he returned to the newly independent Finland in February 1918.

== Military career in Finland ==
=== Return and early career ===
The returned jägers took part in the Finnish Civil War on the white side, and Valve fought in battles of Tampere and Viipuri as an artillery officer. In spring 1918, after the war was over, Valve started as trainer in newly founded Finnish Artillery School in Lappeenranta. In the same autumn he became commander of Heavy Artillery Battalion, from spring 1919 Heavy Artillery regiment, based in the same town. Still in 1918 Valve was promoted captain, in 1919 he became major and lieutenant colonel in 1923.

=== Rise to Navy commander ===
In 1924 Valve started as commander of coastal artillery and in the following year, just at the age of 29, he was promoted colonel; in the 1920s Valve was the fastest promoted member of the Jäger Movement. One reason for the quickly progressed career was the military leadership's aim to push aside the older officers served in the Imperial Russian Army, and place the jägers in the key positions. During 1925–1926 went through Commander Course in General Staff College.

The coastal artillery and navy were put together into one organisation under the same military staff in 1927, and Valve became commander of the entire coastal defence of Finland. He completed Naval Warfare Course in 1929. Valve's title was changed Navy Commander in 1933, and the then 37-year old Valve became major general. The coastal artillery was further enlarged and modernised both at sea coast and lake Ladoga. Valve took part at developing Finnish–Estonian defence co-operation. One part of it was a crisis plan of closing Gulf of Finland in artillery co-operation between the two countries, and as a part of this, Mäkiluoto island close to Porkkala peninsula was fortified.

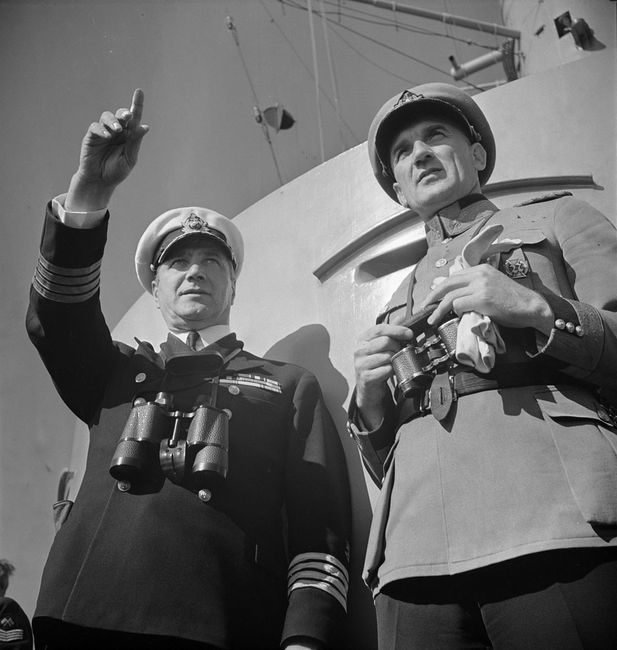
Commodore Eero Rahola and Major General Väinö Valve during naval exercise in 1938

A large part of the Finnish fleet were vessels inherited from the Imperial Russian Navy and in the early 1930s the Navy was strengthened by five submarines and two Väinämöinen-class coastal defence ships; the decision about purchasing the two heavily armed floating fortresses was made without listening to Väinö Valve. After this, the Navy got just a narrow slice of the annual budget of national defence. The head of the Defence Committee, Field Marshal C.G.E. Mannerheim was not familiar with naval warfare. The situation changed in 1938 when Valve became member in the committee; new plans for the Navy development were in place in 1939, but they could not be executed before outbreak of the Winter War.

=== Second World War ===
During the Second World War, Valve led the Navy. Naval activity in the Winter War was low; the coastal artillery fought efficiently against the Soviet Navy and ground forces in Gulf of Viipuri. After the war ended to bitter Moscow Peace Treaty in 1940, Finland established close relationship with Germany. During the subsequent Continuation War the Finnish Navy co-operated with Kriegsmarine, managing to block the Soviet Navy into the eastern bottom of Gulf of Finland. Valve was in a key role, because he had created good relations with the Kriegsmarine already before the war broke out. After signing the Moscow Armistice with the Soviet Union in autumn 1944, Finland was obligated to drive off the German army from its area. Valve experienced the situation personally hard to bear; his troops took the first military action against Germany in Operation Tanne Ost in Suursaari island. This was the starting point of the Lapland War.

== Defence minister ==
Defence minister Rudolf Walden fell ill in late 1944. On 1 December president Mannerheim called Valve, whom he greatly respected, to take the place of Walden in J.K. Paasikivi's cabinet. Apolitical Valve, however, could not readjust himself to work efficiently in the government. After the end of his term in April 1945 he led demining of sea areas. He left the army as lieutenant general in spring 1946.

== Later career ==
Valve started a new career in banking sector. He worked as bank manager for KOP in Saarijärvi 1950–1954 and in Pitäjänmäki, Helsinki in 1954–1959.

Valve was promoted General in 1992. He died in 1995 as the last member of the Jägerbattalion 27.

A street in Lappeenranta was named Väinö Valveen katu and in 2007 city of Helsinki named Väinö Valveen puisto park after him.

== Family ==
During 1921–1948 Valve was married to Margareta (Greta) Helena née Cornér (1884–1968). The couple had three children: Mirja Margareta (b. 1922), Helena Mathilda (married Hänninen; 1925–2005) and Matti Sakari (1928–1975). In 1949 Valve married Aili Aune née Haahti (1907–1996).

== Awards ==
- Grand Cross of the Order of the Cross of Liberty
- Cross of Liberty, 1st Class with a grand star
- Grand Cross of the White Rose of Finland with Collar
- Commander of the White Rose of Finland, 1st Class
- Cross of Liberty, 3rd Class
- Cross of Liberty, 4th Class
- Defence Corps Iron Cross of Merit
- Commemorative Medal for War of Freedom
- Commemorative Medal for Winter War
- Pro Benignitate Humana
- Jaeger Medal
- Grand Officer of the Crown of Italy (Italy)
- Grand Officer of the Three Stars, 2nd Class (Latvia)
- Commander's Cross of Polonia Restituta, 1st Class (Poland)
- Commander of the Sword (Sweden) (1925)
- Commander of Vasa, 1st Class (Sweden) (1934)
- Grand Cross of the Order of the German Eagle (Germany)
- Iron Cross, 1st Class (Germany)
- Prussian Iron Cross, 2nd Class (Germany)
- German 1st World War Commemorative Cross (Germany)
- Commander of the Dannebrog (Denmark)
- Cross of the Eagle, 2nd Class (Estonia)
- Helsinki University Student Union presidium purple ribbon with badge (1993)

== Boards and positions ==
- Military member in Supreme Court (1927–1946)
- Deputy Chairman of Finnish Officers' Association (1928–1929)
- Chairman of Finnish Officers' Association (1929–1930; 1946)
- Head of Navy Department in Ministry of Defence (1932–1934)
- Chairman of Jäger Association (1934–1937)
- Rapporteur of Defence Ministry Navy Department in State Council (1934–1946)
- Member of Defence Council (1938–1940)
- Chairman of State Shipyard executive board (1938–1944)
- Chairman of Disabled War Veterans' Association (1943–1956)
- Chancellor of Order of the Cross of Liberty (1945–1986)
- Chairman of Freedom Warriors' Maintenance Foundation management board (1964–1989; honorary chairman in 1989)
