= Port of Naissaar =

Port in Tallinn, Estonia

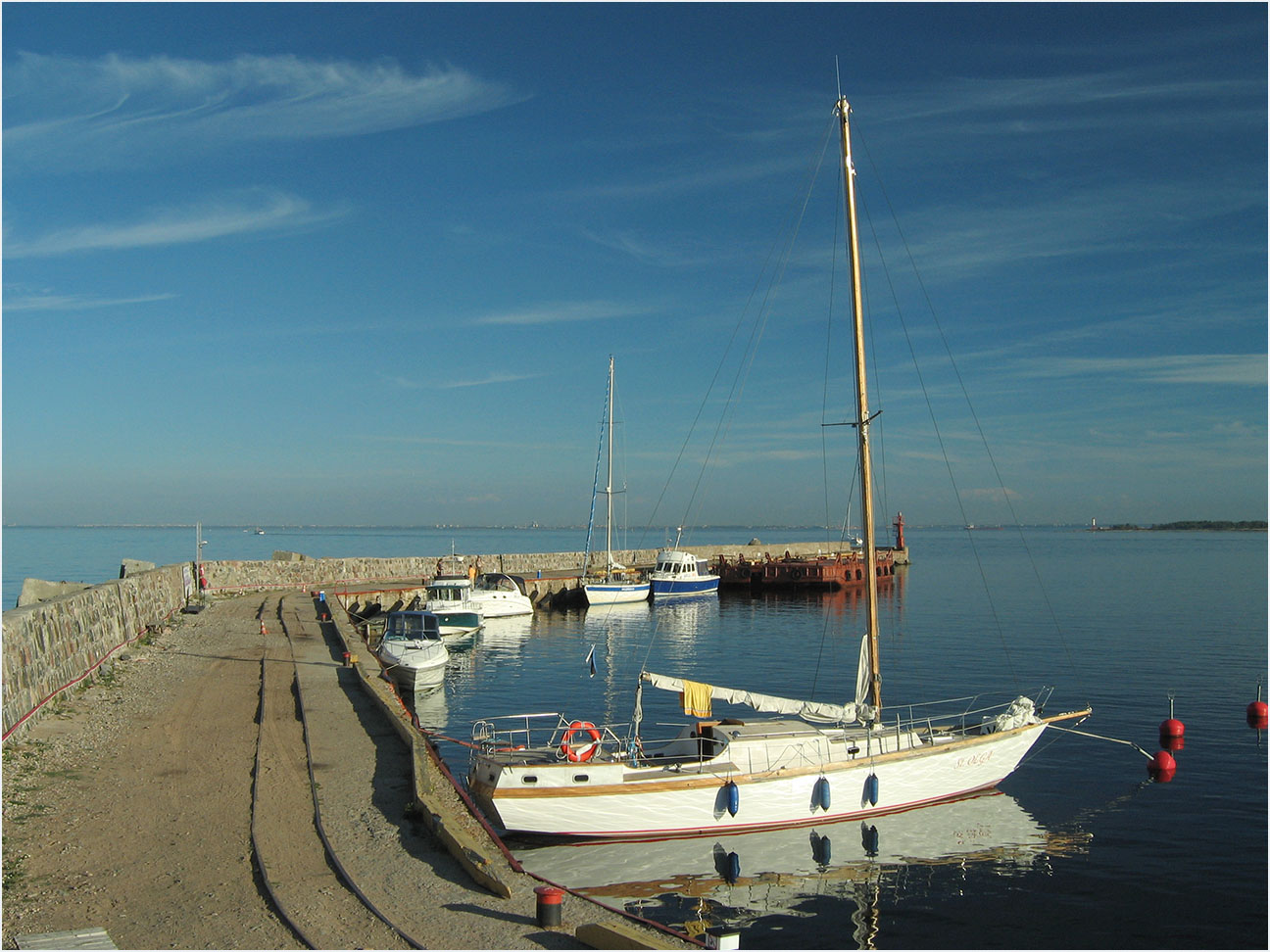
- Yachts in Port of Naissaar
- Click on the map for a fullscreen view

Location
- Country: Estonia
- Location: Naissaar, Tallinn
- Coordinates: 59°33′22.56″N 24°33′14.94″E

Details
- Opened: 20 January 2005
- Operated by: Saarte Liinid
- Type of harbour: Ships & cargo
- Land area: 49,588 square metres (4.9588 ha)
- No. of piers: 3 (primary quays) + 2 (floating piers)

Port of Naissaar (port code EE NAI, Estonian: Naissaare sadam) is a wide seaport which is situated on the east of the coast of the Naissaar island, Viimsi Parish, Estonia, located in northern area of Tallinn Bay.

== See also ==
- Transport in Estonia
