= Finnish minelayer Riilahti =

Finnish minelayer

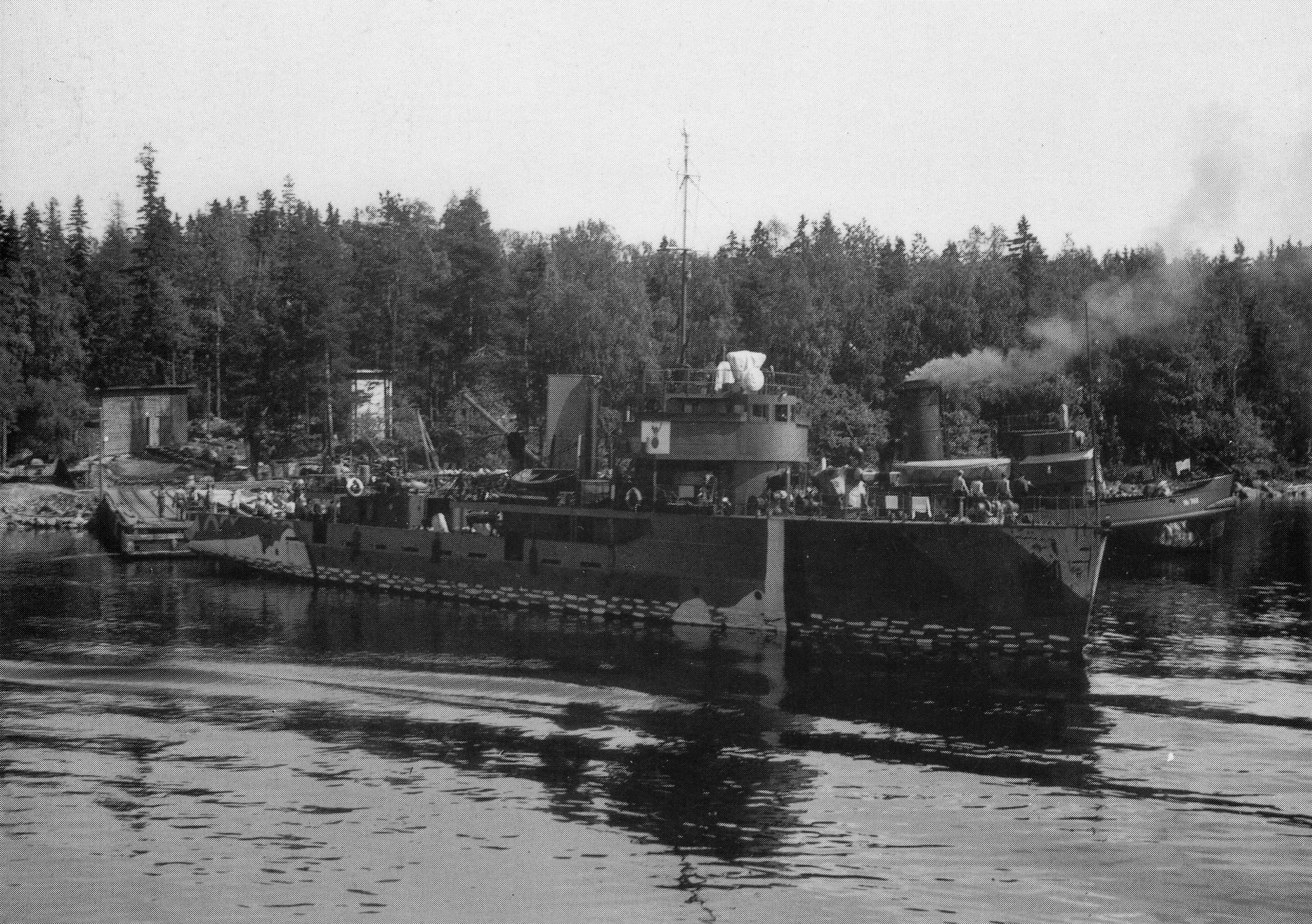
- Riilahti in 1942

History

Finland
- Name: Riilahti
- Namesake: Battle of Riilahti (1714)
- Builder: Wärtsilä Crichton-Vulcan
- Launched: 14 December 1940
- Fate: Torpedoed and sunk 23 August 1943

General characteristics
- Class & type: Ruotsinsalmi-class
- Displacement: 310 t
- Length: 50.0 m (164.0 ft)
- Beam: 7.9 m (26 ft)
- Draught: 1.5 m (4 ft 11 in)
- Propulsion: 2 × MAN diesel (894 kW); later; 2 × Rateau diesel (835 kW)
- Speed: 15 knots (28 km/h; 17 mph)
- Armament: [design]; 1× 75 mm gun; 1× 40 mm Bofors gun; 2× 20 mm Madsen anti-aircraft cannons; depth charge launchers; 3× rails for 100 mines; Smoke generators

Riilahti was a Ruotsinsalmi class minelayer of the Finnish Navy. Riilahti was commissioned in 1940 and sunk in 1943. The vessel was named after the battle of Riilahti, which was fought between Sweden and Russia in 1714.

== New minelayers for the navy ==
Funding for two new minelayers had been secured as early as in 1937, but instead the money was used to refurbish the garrison at Mäkiluoto. Riilahti was launched on December 14, 1940, three weeks after her sister ship Ruotsinsalmi.

The ship had an extensively modified propulsion system and hull, compared to her sister vessel, and it took some time before the crew had figured out all the characteristics of the vessel. Originally, the vessels were intended as escort minesweepers for the Finnish navy's coastal defence ships Ilmarinen and Väinämöinen, and they were therefore designed with a draft of only 1.5 m. Riilahti was armed with one 75 mm gun, one Bofors 40 mm guns and two Madsen 20 mm anti-aircraft cannons. The vessel had three mine dropping rails, and could carry about 100 mines. The ship could also hunt submarines, and was equipped with sonar, depth charge throwers and rails. The vessel was also strong enough to be able to tow minesweeping equipment. She was equipped with smoke generators so she could protect itself, and other near-by vessels from the enemy.

Riilahti was commanded by kapteeniluutnantti Osmo Kivilinna during her entire career.

== Riilahti during the Continuation War ==
Riilahti and Ruotsinsalmi began mining the Gulf of Finland on June 26, 1941, immediately after the outbreak of the Continuation War. Riilahti launched almost 1,000 sea mines during 1941, most of them in the Juminda minefield.

In 1941, Riilahti managed to seize control of a Soviet barge and participated in minesweeping operations south of the Hanko Peninsula.

In the summer of 1942, Riilahti laid numerous mines near Hogland.

Riilahti was sent as reinforcement to the island of Someri on 8 July 1942, when the Russians tried to land and take the island. She was involved in artillery duels with ships from the Soviet Navy, gave fire support to the Finnish defenders on the island and fended off several air attacks. The vessel counted 56 aircraft attacking her, but she survived, thanks to the gallantry of her crew. The island was held by the Finnish defenders.

The Marshal of Finland, Gustaf Mannerheim, awarded the Mannerheim Cross to Osmo Kivilinna on 8 March 1943, citing the war record of the ship, whose characteristics still were not all known. The ship had also previously sunk the Soviet submarine Shch-406 together with some German patrol vessels on 26 May 1943.

== The last battle ==
On August 22, 1943 at 5.30 am, Riilahti set out from Loviisa on an anti-submarine mission west of Hogland. The patrol vessel VMV 1 followed her on the journey. At 2 pm on August 23 an outlook spotted two Soviet motor torpedo boats and sounded the alarm. The officer on duty had previously ordered the engines to be stopped so that the hydrophone operators could listen for submarine sounds easier. While the vessel tried to start her engines and reach steering power, the Soviet motor torpedo boat TK 94 fired a torpedo, which struck Riilahti amidships and broke her in two. Riilahti sunk in two minutes, taking with her 23 of her crew. VMV 1 saved eleven men from the water, one being the commander of the ship, and Mannerheim knight Osmo Kivilinna. He later died from his wounds on the operating table.

This was one of the most significant single losses during the war years; Kivinlinna was a very well-liked officer, and it was widely believed that he could become the first full Admiral of the Finnish Navy.

The wreck of Riilahti lies five nautical miles from the island of Tiiskeri at a depth of 70 m. The loss of Riilahti left the Finnish Navy with a gap in their mine warfare capabilities. This was addressed with the launching of the Keihässalmi in 1957.

The third engine, which had been ordered, but not yet fitted on the Riilahti was instead fitted onto the sister vessel Ruotsinsalmi.

Riilahti laid 1,733 sea mines and 599 obstacles during her career. It is estimated over 50 Soviet vessels sank by running into mines laid by her.
