= Coastal batteries of Estonia =

Military unit of Estonia

Estonian Naval Fortresses
- The flag of the Estonian Naval Fortresses
- Active: 13 November 1918 - 1 April 1940
- Country: Estonia
- Allegiance: Estonian Navy
- Branch: artillery
- Type: coastal artillery
- Role: surface warfare
- Size: 656 peacetime strength 1183 combat strength
- Garrison/HQ: Aegna; Naissaar; Suurupi; Miiduranna; Leppneeme; Randvere
- Anniversaries: 13 November 1918; 16 February 1919

Commanders
- Notable commanders: Major-General Johannes Orasmaa; Colonel Vladimir Janitz; Lieutenant-Colonel Karl Aleksander Freimann; Captain-Major Vassili Martson; Captain Joan Masik; Captain Joan Masik; Captain Konrad Rotschild; Staff-Captain Eduard Aindt

The coastal batteries presented itself as a powerful strike force of the Estonian Navy between 1918 and 1940.

== History ==
Since the end of the 19th century, the Russian Empire began to build coastal fortresses and naval strongholds to Estonia which was annexed to empire after the Great Northern War in 1721. Tallinn having been historically an important trading center between the East and the West became one of the main naval bases of the Imperial Russian Baltic fleet. A systematic coastal defence network and naval gun installations were ordered and the construction works began at the end of the 1890s.

=== During the Republic of Estonia ===
Most of the coastal fortifications and fortresses were blown up by the retreating Russians units in October 1917, which took place after the Germans had landed on the islands. During the Estonian War of Independence and after the Treaty of Tartu the Estonia Navy began to rebuild and develop the coastal defence network. During the period of independence from 1918 to 1940 Estonia invested millions of kroons into the renovation and development of the coastal defence. By 1939 the coastal batteries presented a considerable naval force and were considered among the Navy elite forces.

=== The end of the coastal batteries and the Soviet occupation ===
During World War II and later the Soviet occupation of Estonia, little has remained of the former coastal defence lines and fortifications. Today some buildings and firing positions can be seen at various places of which the best preserved ones are located on the island of Aegna.

== Gallery ==
Tallinn: Armoured-trains 102 mm gun platform No. 215
