= Ruotsinsalmi-class minelayer =

Finnish navy minelayer class

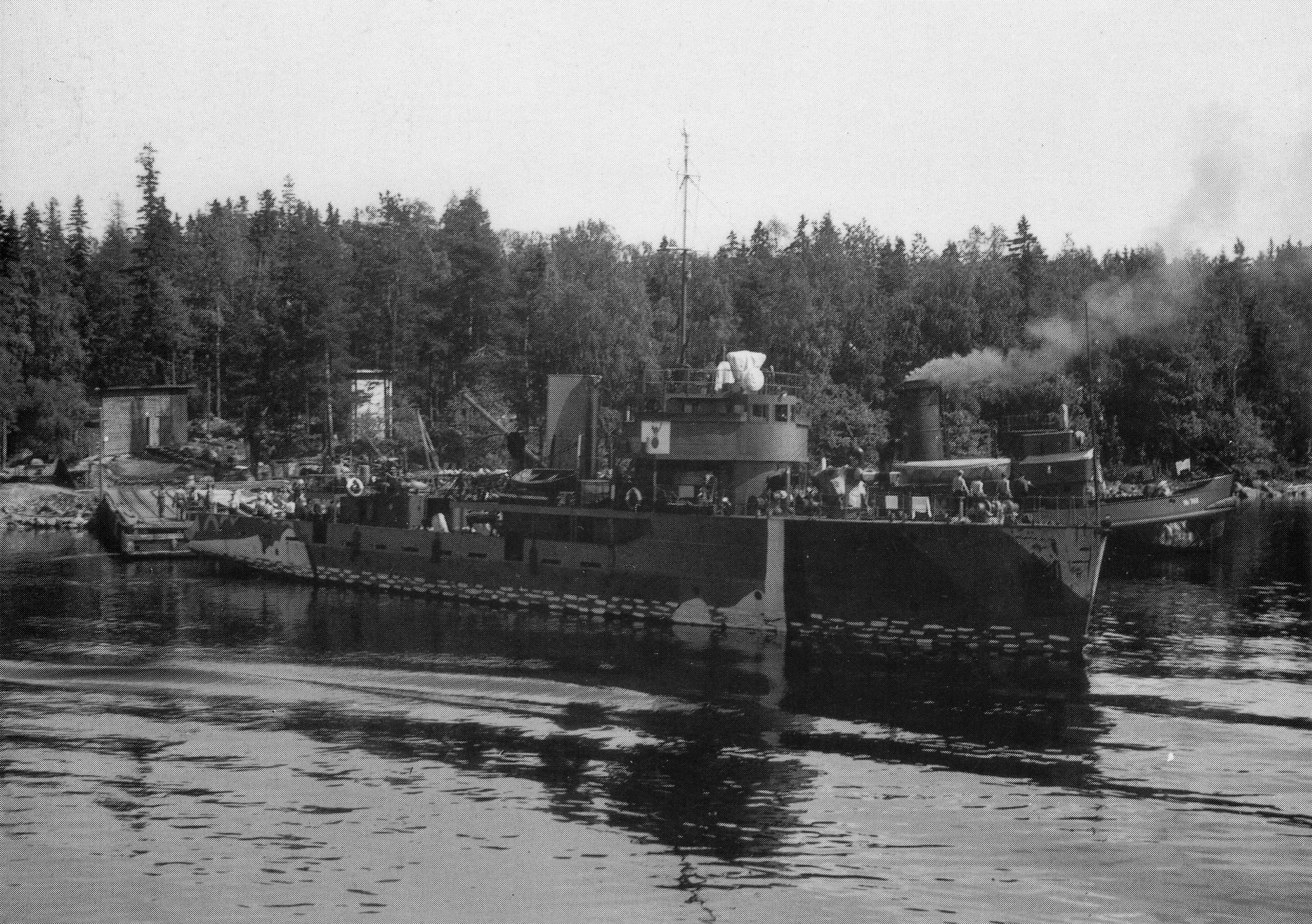
- Riilahti

Class overview
- Name: Ruotsinsalmi class
- Builders: Crichton-Vulcan, Turku
- Operators: Finnish Navy
- Succeeded by: Keihässalmi
- In service: 1941–1975
- Completed: 2
- Lost: 1
- Retired: 1

General characteristics
- Type: Minelayer
- Displacement: 310 t (310 long tons)
- Length: 50 m (164 ft 1 in)
- Beam: 7.9 m (25 ft 11 in)
- Draught: 1.5 m (4 ft 11 in)
- Propulsion: 2 × Rateau diesel, 2 props, 890 kW (1,200 bhp)
- Speed: 15 knots (28 km/h; 17 mph)
- Complement: 60
- Armament: 1 × 75 mm (3.0 in) gun; 2 × 20 mm (0.79 in) Madsen anti-aircraft cannons; Depth charge launchers; 3 × rails for 100 mines

The Ruotsinsalmi-class minelayers were a two-strong class of minelayers in the Finnish Navy. The two ships, comprising Ruotsinsalmi and Riilahti, were constructed in Finland and saw service in the Winter War and World War II. Riihahti was sunk in an engagement with Soviet motor torpedo boats on 23 August 1943. Ruotsinsalmi survived the wars and remained in service in the post war Finnish Navy until being withdrawn in the 1970s. (Note: Moore and Westerlund & Chumbley claim the vessel was deleted in 1975 and Chesneau states the vessel was stricken in 1977.)

== Design and description ==
By the late-1930s, the Finnish Navy was focused on defence of the nation and the only ships under construction by Finland were the Ruotsinsalmi-class minelayers and assorted smaller craft. This was due to the majority of the defence budget being awarded to the Finnish Army. The Ruotsinsalmis measured 50 metres (164 ft 1 in) long overall with a beam of 7.9 m (25 ft 11 in) and a draught of 1.5 m (4 ft 11 in). They had a standard displacement of 310 tonnes (310 long tons). (Note: Couhat has the standard displacement as 270 t (270 long tons) and the full load displacement at 310 tonnes.) The vessels were powered by two Rateau diesel engines turning two shafts creating 890 kilowatts (1,200 bhp) and giving the minelayers a maximum speed of 15 knots (28 km/h; 17 mph). They had a complement of 60.

The ships were armed with one 50-calibre 75-millimetre (3.0 in) gun and two Madsen 20 mm (0.79 in) anti-aircraft cannons for anti-aircraft warfare. The vessels were also equipped with mine dropping rails, and could carry about 100 mines. Though not designed for anti-submarine warfare, the Ruotsinsalmi-class ships mounted two depth charge racks and two throwers.

== Vessels of the class ==
Ruotsinsalmi class construction data
Ship name	Builder	Laid down	Launched	Commissioned	Fate
Ruotsinsalmi	Crichton-Vulcan, Turku	1938	May 1940	February 1941	Deleted 1977
Riilahti	Crichton-Vulcan, Turku	1938	1940	1941	Torpedoed and sunk, 23 August 1943

== Construction and career ==
Both Riilahti and sister ship Ruotsinsalmi were laid down in 1938, launched in 1940 and completed in 1941. The minelayers were active in the Winter War and again in World War II both times engaged with the Soviet Union. In July 1943, Soviet forces attempted a breakout into the Baltic Sea from where the Finns had them blockaded via the Seeigel-Rukajärvi mine barrage. There were a number of naval encounters in the Soviet attempt and Riihahti was sunk on 23 August 1943 in a battle with Soviet motor torpedo boats. (Note: Westerlund states that Riihahti was torpedoed by a submarine.) Ruotsinsalmi survived the war and remained in the Finnish Navy even after the terms of the Paris Peace Treaty of 1947 that was signed following the end of World War II restricted the navy's operational capacities. In the post war era, Ruotsinsalmi was rearmed with two 40 mm (1.6 in) guns and two 20 mm guns while retaining her minelaying capability. Moore and Westerlund & Chumbley claim the vessel was deleted in 1975 and Westerlund states the vessel was stricken in 1977.
