= Finnish minelayer Keihässalmi =

Coordinates: 60.4356°N 22.2351°E

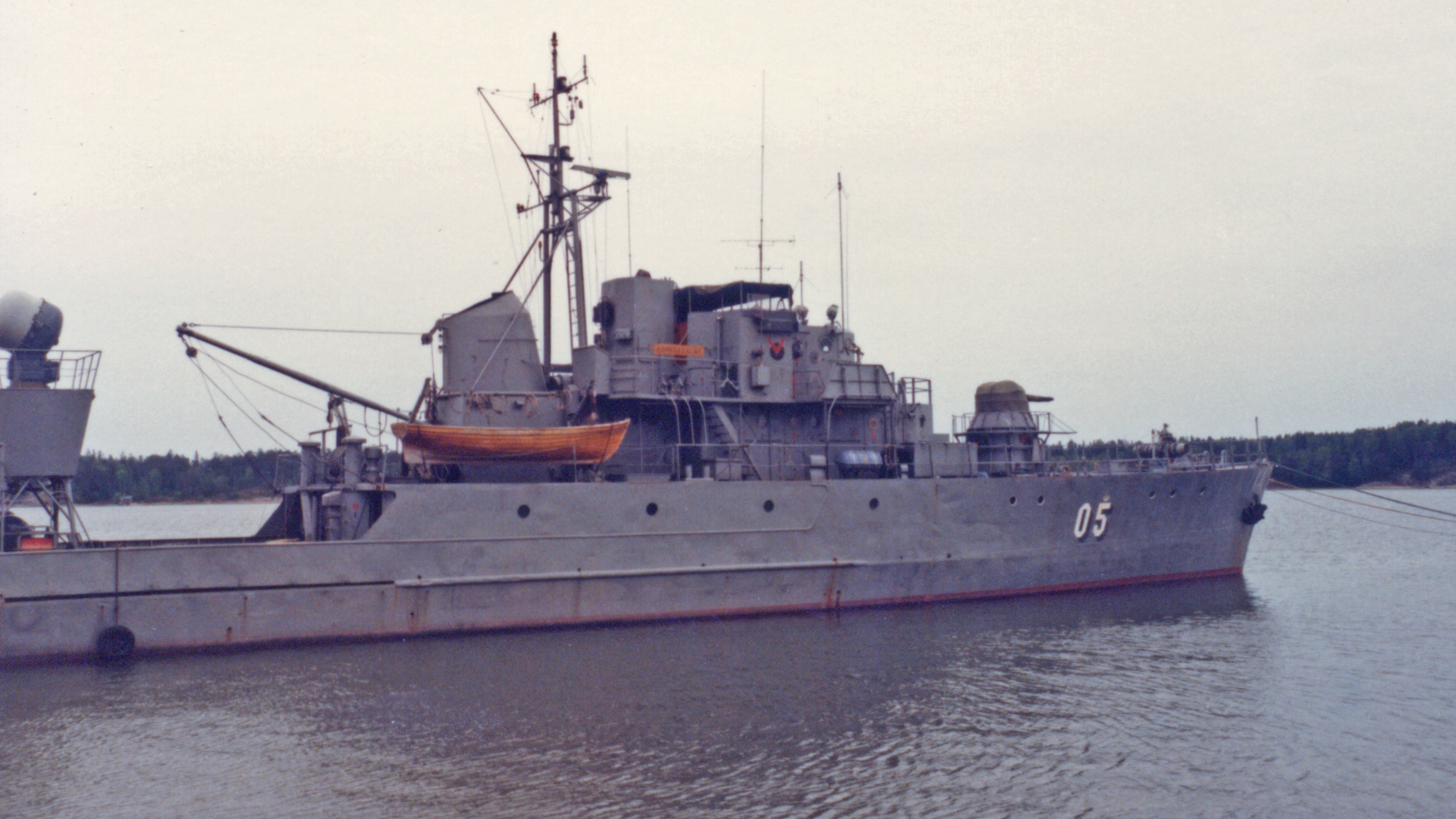
- Keihässalmi in 1983

History

Finland
- Name: Keihässalmi
- Namesake: The strait of Keihässalmi in Sipoo
- Builder: Valmet, Helsinki
- Launched: 16 March 1957
- Decommissioned: 1994
- Fate: Museum ship in Turku

General characteristics
- Class & type: Keihässalmi-class
- Displacement: 360 t
- Length: 56.0 m (183.7 ft)
- Beam: 7.7 m (25 ft)
- Draught: 2.2 m (7 ft 3 in)
- Propulsion: 2 × MAN Diesel (1,194 kW) later 2 × Wärtsilä diesel (1,200 kW)
- Speed: 15 knots (28 km/h; 17 mph)
- Complement: 60
- Armament: 2 × 40 mm Bofors; 2 × 20 mm Madsen; Mines; later; 2 × double barrel 30 mm AK-230 Nikolayev; 2 × 20 mm Madsen; 2 × 12,7 mm; Mines

Keihässalmi (pennant number "05") was a minelayer of the Finnish Navy. She was commissioned in 1957 and remained in service until 1994, after which she was turned into a museum ship in Turku. The vessel was named after the strait of Keihässalmi, which is located in Sipoo. Keihässalmi was the first Finnish minelayer to be constructed after World War II.

Keihässalmi was designed according to lessons learned from the Ruotsinsalmi class minelayers, but with increased size and tonnage. It was stronger, more seaworthy and faster than its predecessor. The construction took place from 1956 to 1957 at the Valmet Oy shipyard in Helsinki. The sinking of the minelayer Riilahti in 1943 had left a big gap in Finnish mine warfare capabilities, and a new vessel was needed. It would last until the mid-1950s before this was addressed, due to the harsh after-war conditions and war-payments which included many ships to be constructed at Finnish shipyards.

The Keihässalmi was fitted with almost all weapons systems available to the Finnish Navy (except torpedoes), although she primarily was a minelayer and minesweeper. Keihässalmi was launched on 16 March 1957 and the vessel remained the largest vessel of the Finnish Navy until 1962, when the frigate Matti Kurki was purchased. It was also used as a sort of test-bed for multiple systems. At one point a 75 mm gun was fitted to the ship, as the Finnish Navy lacked designated gunships. The ship was also used for training, and was sent out on trips every sailing season. The Keihässalmi was cheap to operate and required a low complement (important as the Finnish Navy had a manpower restriction), but the vessel proved itself over the decades. The ship underwent repairs and refitting from 1975 until 1981, when its seaworthiness was improved by the installment of ballast tanks. The forward mine section was slightly modified to allow the vessel travel in high seas. The weaponry was modernized and the gunlaying was now radar-guided. Keihässalmi was the flagship of the Finnish Navy and she made many visits to other countries in the 1960s. She was the official school ship of the navy from 1975 until 1979, awaiting the replacement for the Matti Kurki. Keihässalmi was retired and turned into a museum ship in 1994. She is currently on display at the Forum Marinum museum in Turku.
