= Naissaar Landscape Conservation Area =

Protected area in Estonia

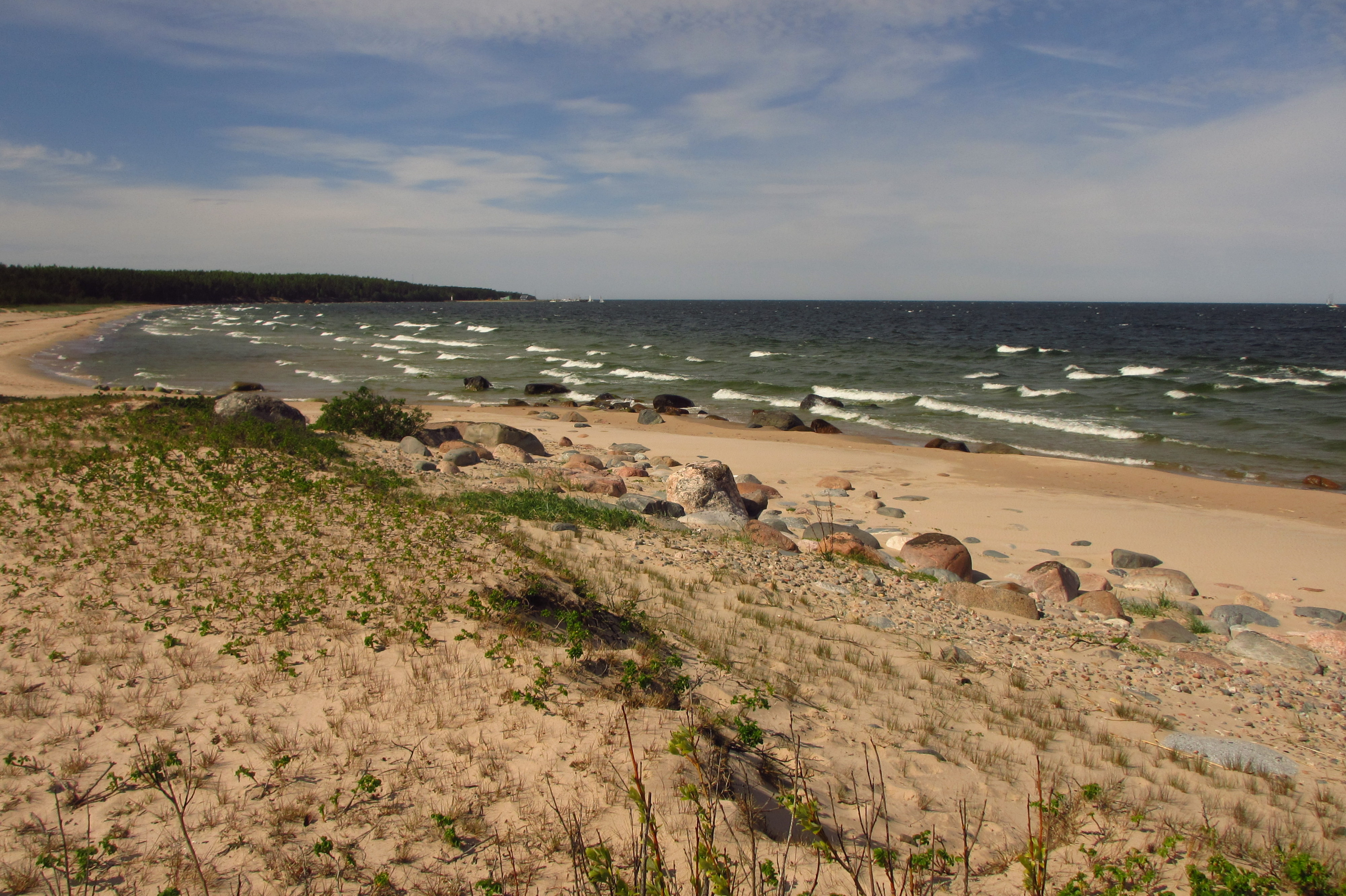

- Location within Estonia
- Location: Naissaar, Estonia
- Coordinates: 59°34′N 24°31′E
- Area: 1,893 ha (4,680 acres)
- Established: 1992 (1995)

Naissaar Landscape Conservation Area (Estonian: Naissaare maastikukaitseala or Naissaare looduspark) is a nature park that comprises the island of Naissaar in Harju County, Estonia.

The area of the nature park is 1893 ha.

The protected area was founded in 1992 to protect landscapes and biodiversity of Naissaar Island. In 1995, the protected area was designated to the landscape conservation area.
