= Juminda =

Village in Estonia

- Village
- Location in Estonia
- Coordinates: 59°38′19″N 25°30′27″E
- Country: Estonia
- County: Harju County
- Municipality: Kuusalu Parish
- First mentioned: 1290

Population (1 January 2012)
  - Total: 35

Juminda is a village in Kuusalu Parish, Harju County in northern Estonia. It is located on the coast of the Gulf of Finland, on top of the Juminda Peninsula, on the territory of Lahemaa National Park. Juminda has a population of 35 (as of 1 January 2012).

Juminda was first mentioned in 1290 as Jumentake. In the Middle Ages Juminda was inhabited by the Swedes. There's a 25 m lighthouse which was built in 1937.

In August 1941, one of the deadliest naval battles in the world took place near the Juminda peninsula. It was part of the Soviet evacuation of Tallinn when the Soviets planned to evacuate parts of the Baltic Fleet from Tallinn to Leningrad but were stopped by a 32 km long strip of mines placed by the Germans and Finns.

The convoys consisted of a few hundred ships, some of them being passenger ships carrying Estonian and Latvian citizens. According to historian Mati Õun, 52 ships were sunk with up to 25,000 people on board. In 1972 a memorial stone was established in Juminda.

Estonian-Swedish politician Enn Kokk (1937–2019) was born in Juminda.

== Gallery ==
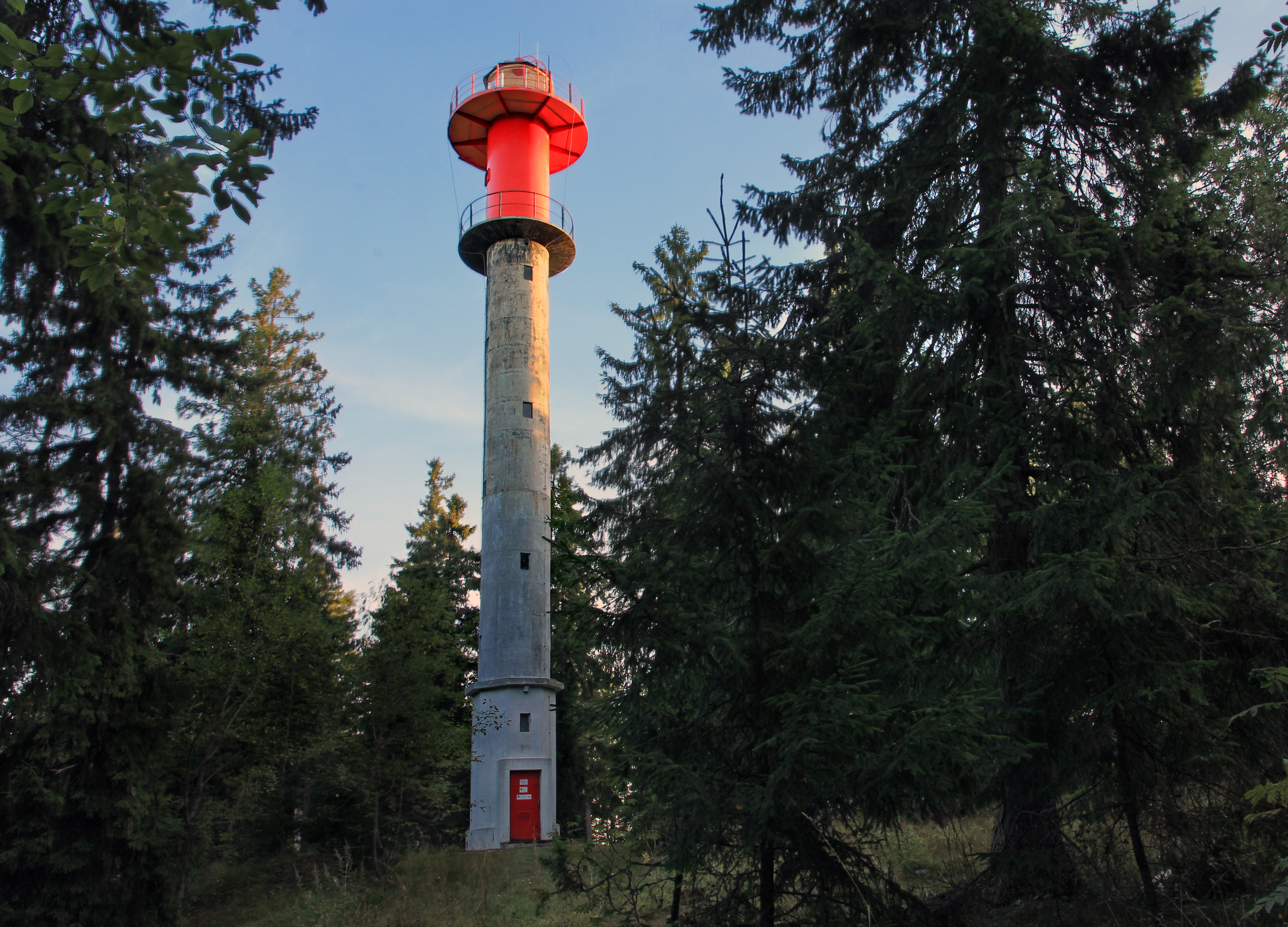
Juminda lighthouse

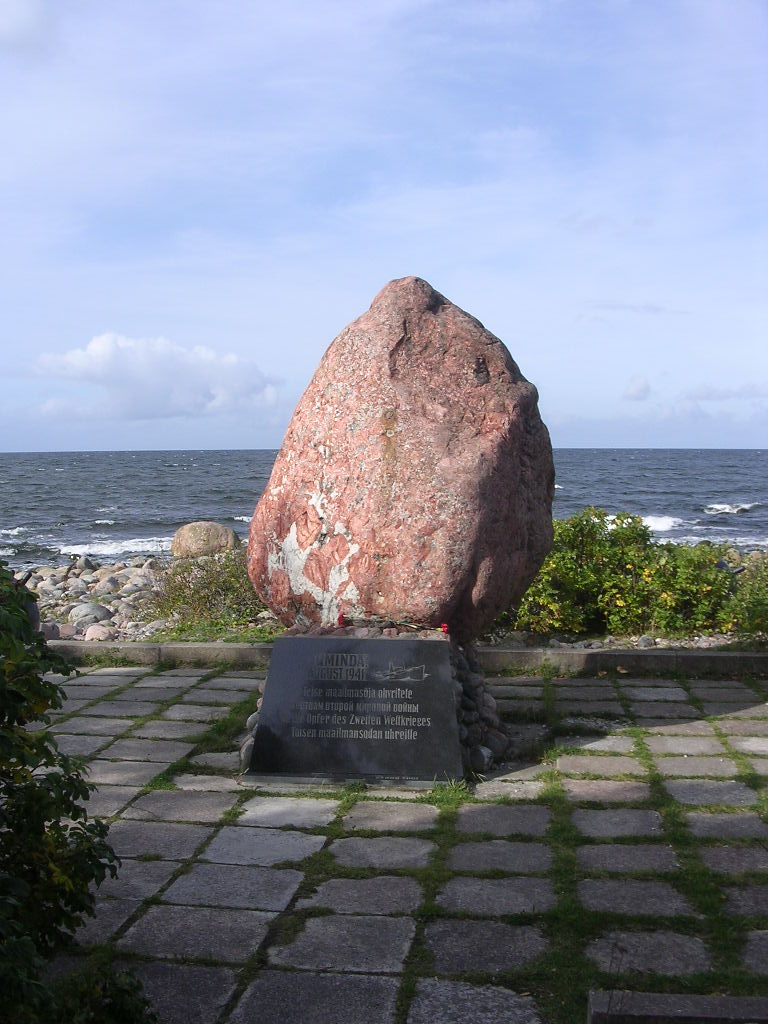
Monument to the victims of the naval battle

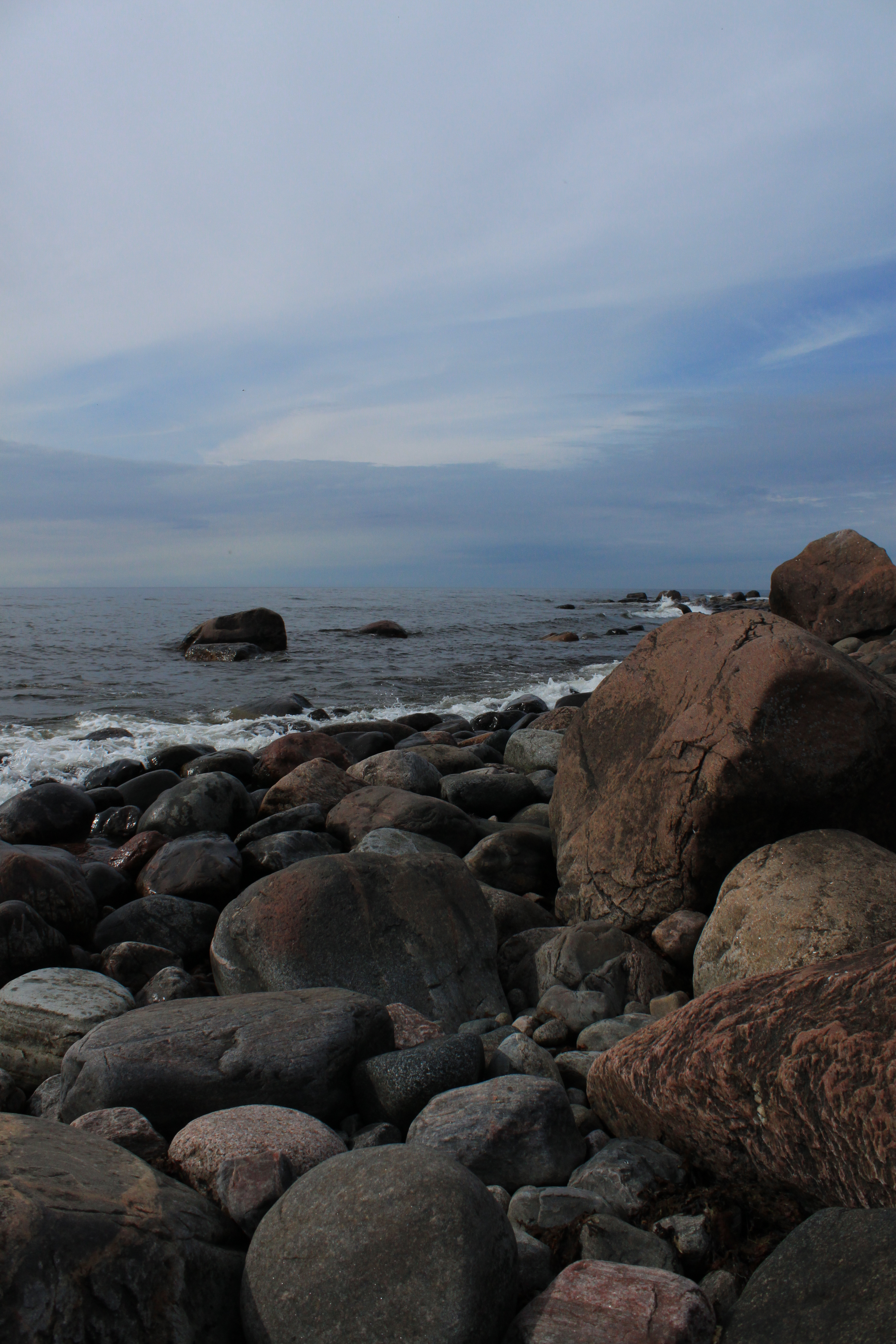
coastline near Juminda

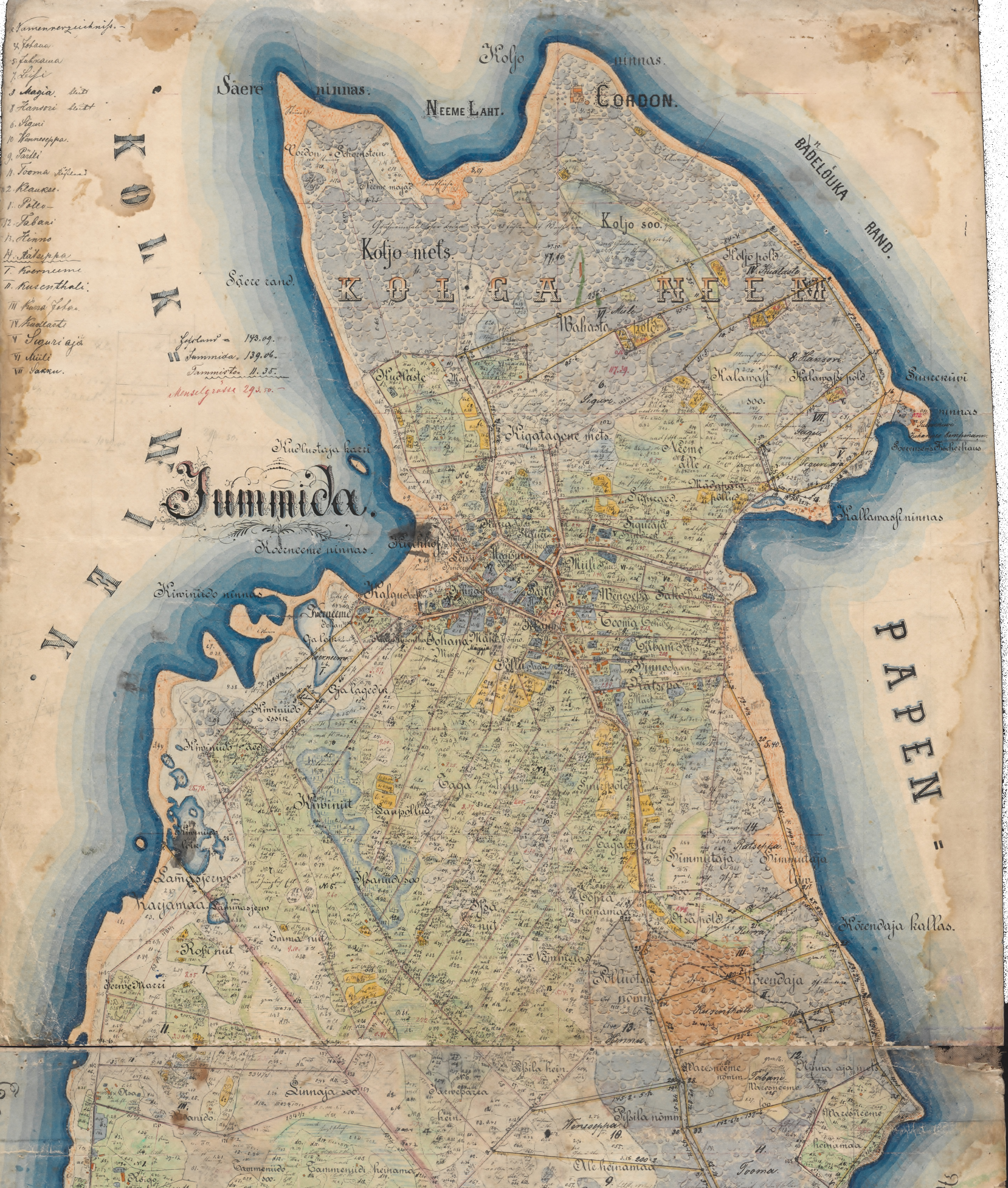
households of Juminda, end 19th century
