= Naissaar =

Island in Estonia

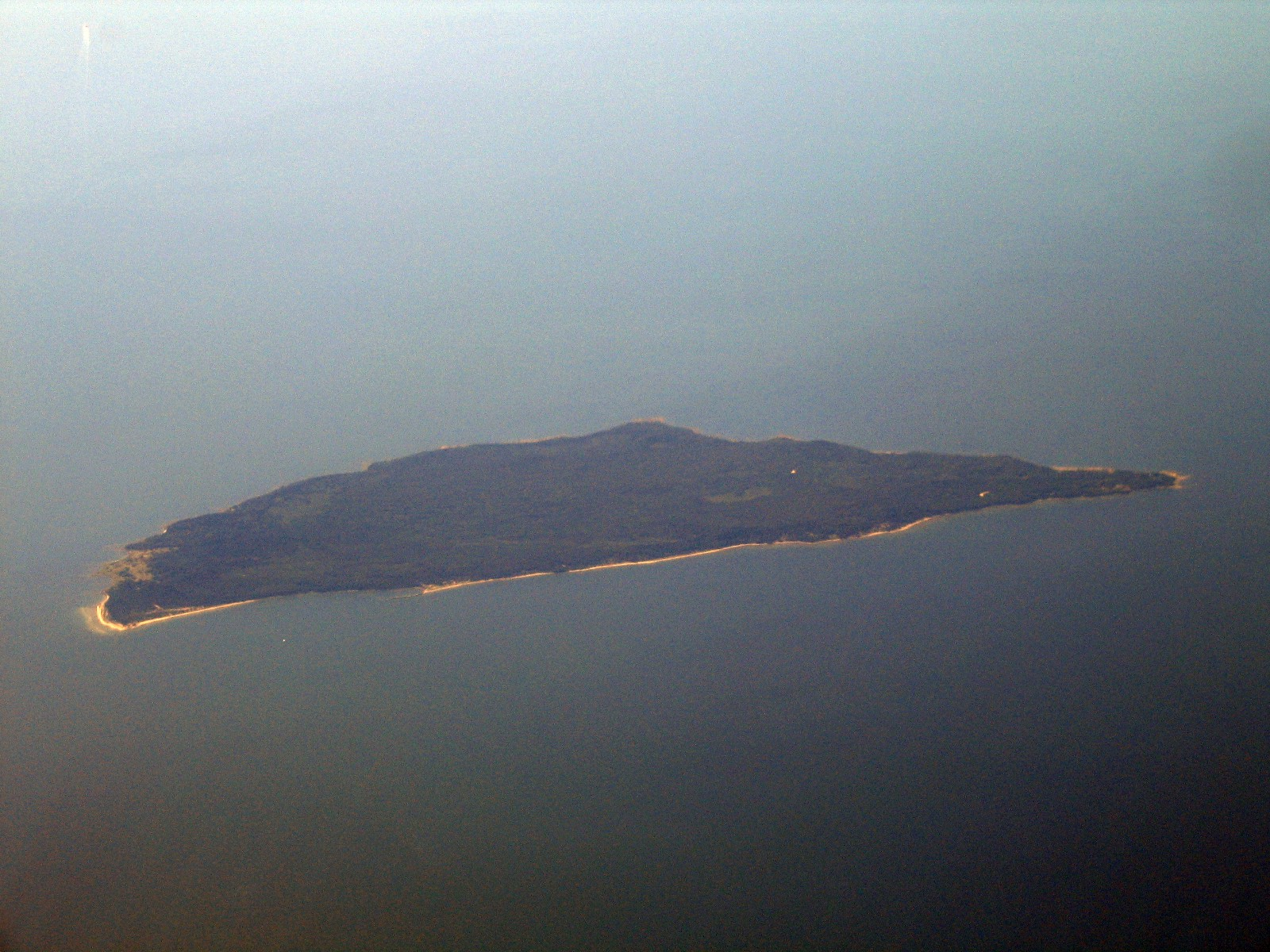
- Naissaar from the air

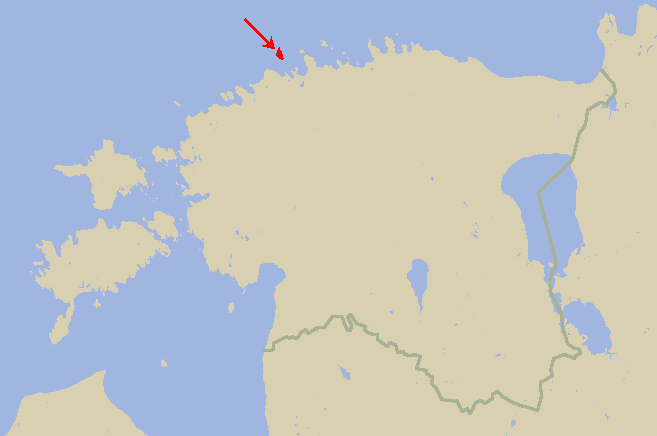
- Etymology: Estonian: 'island of women'

Geography
- Coordinates: 59°34′N 24°31′E
- Adjacent to: Gulf of Finland
- Area: 18.6 km^{2} (7.2 sq mi)
- Length: 8 km (5 mi)
- Width: 3.5 km (2.17 mi)

Administration
- Estonia
- Parish: Viimsi

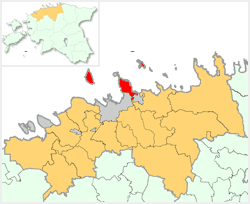
Location of the Viimsi parish (in red)

Naissaar (Swedish: Nargö; German: Nargen) is an island in Estonia. It is located in the Gulf of Finland, northwest of the capital city Tallinn, and is administratively part of Viimsi Parish. The island has an area of 18.6 square kilometres (7.2 square miles). It is 8 kilometres (5.0 miles) long and 3.5 kilometres (2.2 miles) wide, and lies about 8.5 kilometres (5.3 miles) from the mainland. The highest point on the island is Kunilamägi, which is 27 metres (89 feet) above sea level. The island consists predominantly of coniferous forest and piles of stones and boulders. In 2020, the island had a population of 17; in 2011 the island had about 35 permanent residents and some summer residents.

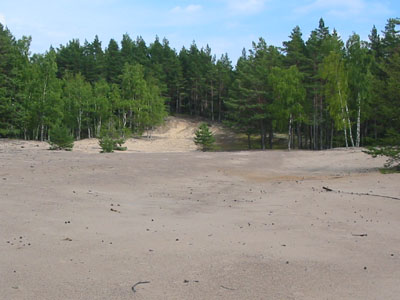
Kunilamägi, the highest point on the island, at 27 metres (89 ft) above sea level.

Until the Second World War, the island's population numbered about 450 people of Estonian-Swedish origin. However, these people fled during the war. Naissaar under Soviet rule was a military area and off-limits to the public. After the Second World War, the settlement on the entire island were combined into a single village called Naissaare. In 2011, this was re-divided into the three historical villages of Lõunaküla (Storbyn), Tagaküla (Bakbyn), and Väikeheinamaa (Lillängin).

Although the fortifications on the island date back to Peter the Great's scheme to fortify Tallinn, the main fortifications are from the period of Russian rule before World War I. Today, the previous small houses of the Swedish villages are gradually being restored. Also being restored is a narrow gauge railway that runs from the north to the southern tip of the island.

A notable native of the island was Bernhard Schmidt, the German-Estonian optician who invented the Schmidt telescope in 1930.

== Lighthouse ==
Naissaar Lighthouse was first built in 1788, although the present lighthouse dates to 1960. It is 45 meters tall.

== History ==
In Estonian the name of the island, Nais-saar, means 'island of women', and it is possible that Naissaar is the island the chronicle of Adam of Bremen mentioned around 1075 under the name Terra Feminarum. As well as this, Arabic coins have been discovered on the island as early as the eighth century. Estonian Swedish fishermen were well established on the island by the 15th century, and the Swedes erected a small fortress there in 1705 during the Great Northern War. After the war, Estonia became part of the Russian Empire. The tsar had a new fortress with five bastions built in 1720 for the defense of Tallinn and St. Petersburg.

A single-ship action took place off the north end of the island on 23 June [O.S. 11 June] 1808, when the 14-gun Russian cutter Opyt fought unsuccessfully against the British 44-gun frigate HMS Salsette.

In 1850 the island's population was 155 people, and by 1858 it had grown to 188, most of whom were Estonian Swedes. Between 1853 and 1856, the inhabitants built a new chapel that was part of the Swedish parish of St. Michael in Tallinn. In 1874, a school was also opened on the island.

In the early twentieth century, Russia began modernizing its fortifications in the Gulf of Finland. However, the outbreak of the First World War stopped the planned improvements for Naissaar. Nonetheless, in 1914 the Russians opened a narrow-gauge railway line, with a total trackage of 37.7 km.

=== Soviet Republic of Nargen ===
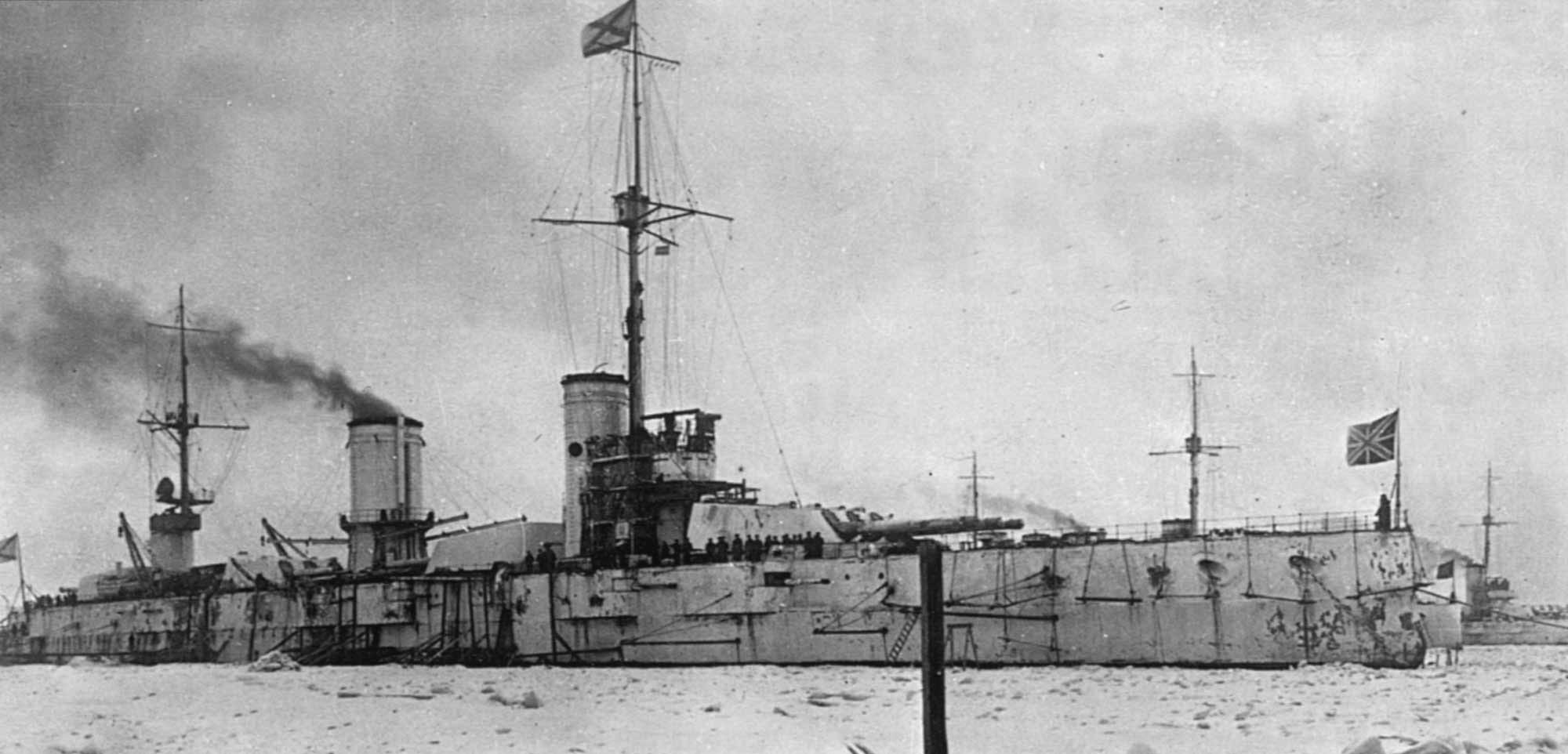
Russian battleship Petropavlovsk

The Russian anarcho-syndicalist Stepan Petrichenko was taken into the Russian navy in 1913 and assigned to the Russian battleship Petropavlovsk. During the February Revolution the ship was based at Naissaar, which had been emptied of its inhabitants in 1914. The Russians built a new fort on the island during the First World War, stationing 80 to 90 sailors there.

After the October Revolution in 1917, the sailors convened a "Council of Workers and Soldiers' Ambassadors", declaring the local People's Commissar Council on 17 December, which included the Commissioner for War, Home Affairs, Labor, Finance and Health; they were later joined by an Education Commissioner. Petrichenko was elected Chairman of the Council. The Council declared: "In constitutional terms, Nargen has been designated to be an independent Soviet republic", naming it the Soviet Republic of Soldiers and Fortress-Builders of Nargen.

The Council began drafting a constitution, the capital was designated the Southern Village and the anthem "The Internationale". The flag became the red-black flag of anarcho-syndicalism. It was also intended to issue its own money, but the name of the units is unknown. Bolshevik authorities in mainland Estonia sent prisoners to the island "to fortify some of the castles, clear the railroads, carry snow and dig sand."

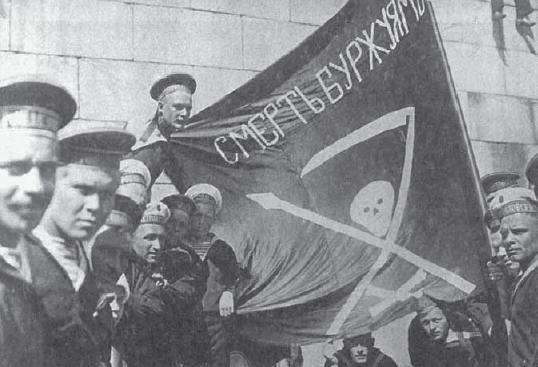
Sailors of the Petropavlovsk in Helsinki, 1917

After German forces occupied the island on 26 February 1918, the Baltic fleet evacuated most of its population, moving towards Helsinki and then to Kronstadt. Thus the "soviet republic" ceased to exist. The few remaining people were imprisoned in the harbor barracks, and military buildings were destroyed. However, some of the sites were rescued by a local forest ranger who disconnected wires to the explosives. A week later, the Bolsheviks ceded the Baltics to the German Empire in the Treaty of Brest-Litovsk. Stepan Petrichenko became widely known in 1921, as the leader of the Kronstadt uprising against the Bolsheviks, after which he fled to Finland.

=== Between the wars ===
The Estonian government executed forty Bolshevik prisoners of war here in February 1919. As the result of the German revolution and capitulation of Germany in World War I, the German occupiers handed over rule of Naissaar to the Estonian Provisional Government on 19 November 1918. After the Estonian Constituent Assembly met on 23 April 1919, and the first elected government of the Republic of Estonia took office, the Estonian Provisional Government resigned on 8 May 1919. The island then became part of the new Estonian Republic in 1920. The Estonian Republic also used Naissaar as a naval base. In 1934, 450 people lived on the island, of whom 291 were Estonians, most of whom in turn were in the Estonian army. The army of the Republic of Estonia continued to use the railway for military purposes throughout the 1930s.

=== World War II ===
When the Soviet Union occupied Estonia in 1940, Naissaar was designated a military area and the local population forced to leave. During the German occupation beginning in 1941, while military use of the island continued, the islanders were allowed to return. Almost all islanders were evacuated or fled to Sweden in 1943—1944, before the return of the Soviets.

=== Post-war ===
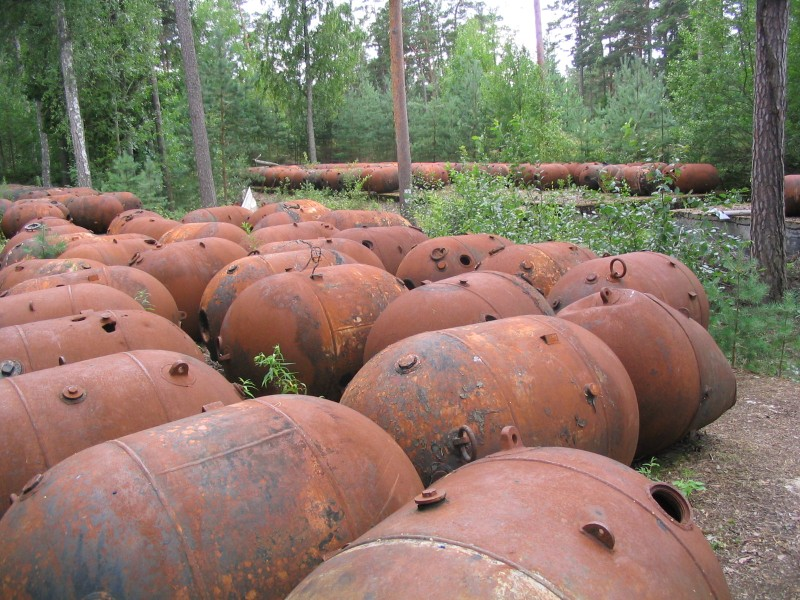
Naval mines dating from the Soviet Union

During the period of the Estonian Soviet Socialist Republic, the Soviet Union established its largest factory for naval mines in the Baltic on the island. The Soviets therefore declared the island a military area and off-limits to the public. The Soviets also used the railway to connect the factory to the port.

=== Post-Soviet period ===
When the Soviets left Naissaar in early 1993, they burned the explosives in the naval mines, leaving a multitude of metal casings scattered throughout the island. Many of these were scavenged as scrap iron, but a field of mines is still visible near the wharf at Mädasadam. Another legacy of the arms industry is that the soil of the island remains contaminated by oil and heavy metals.

In 1995 Naissaar Landscape Conservation Area was established, occupying the entire area of the island.

The Naissaar Museum, presenting the military history of the island, is located in Lõunaküla.

== Gallery ==
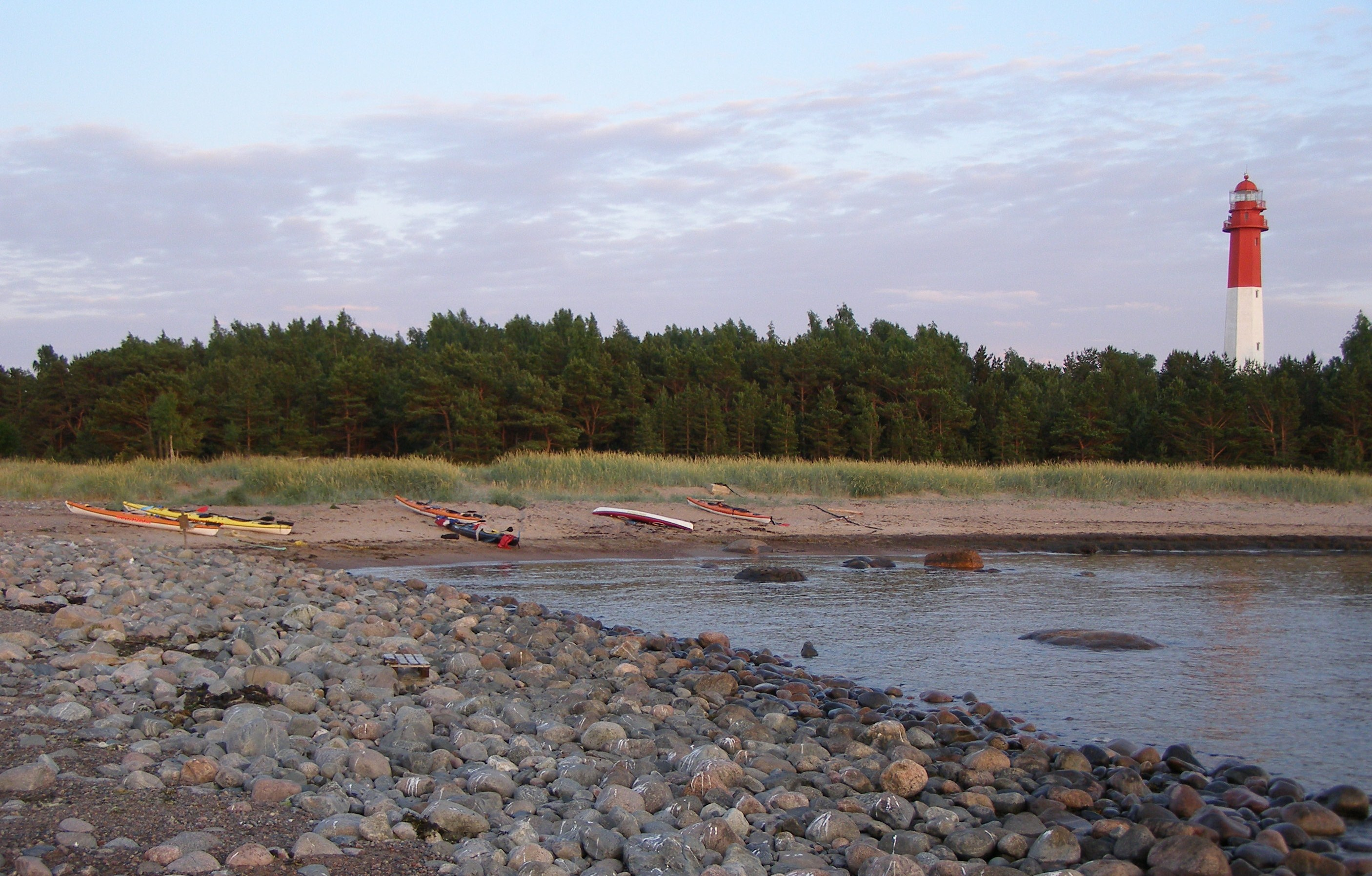
Naissaare lighthouse

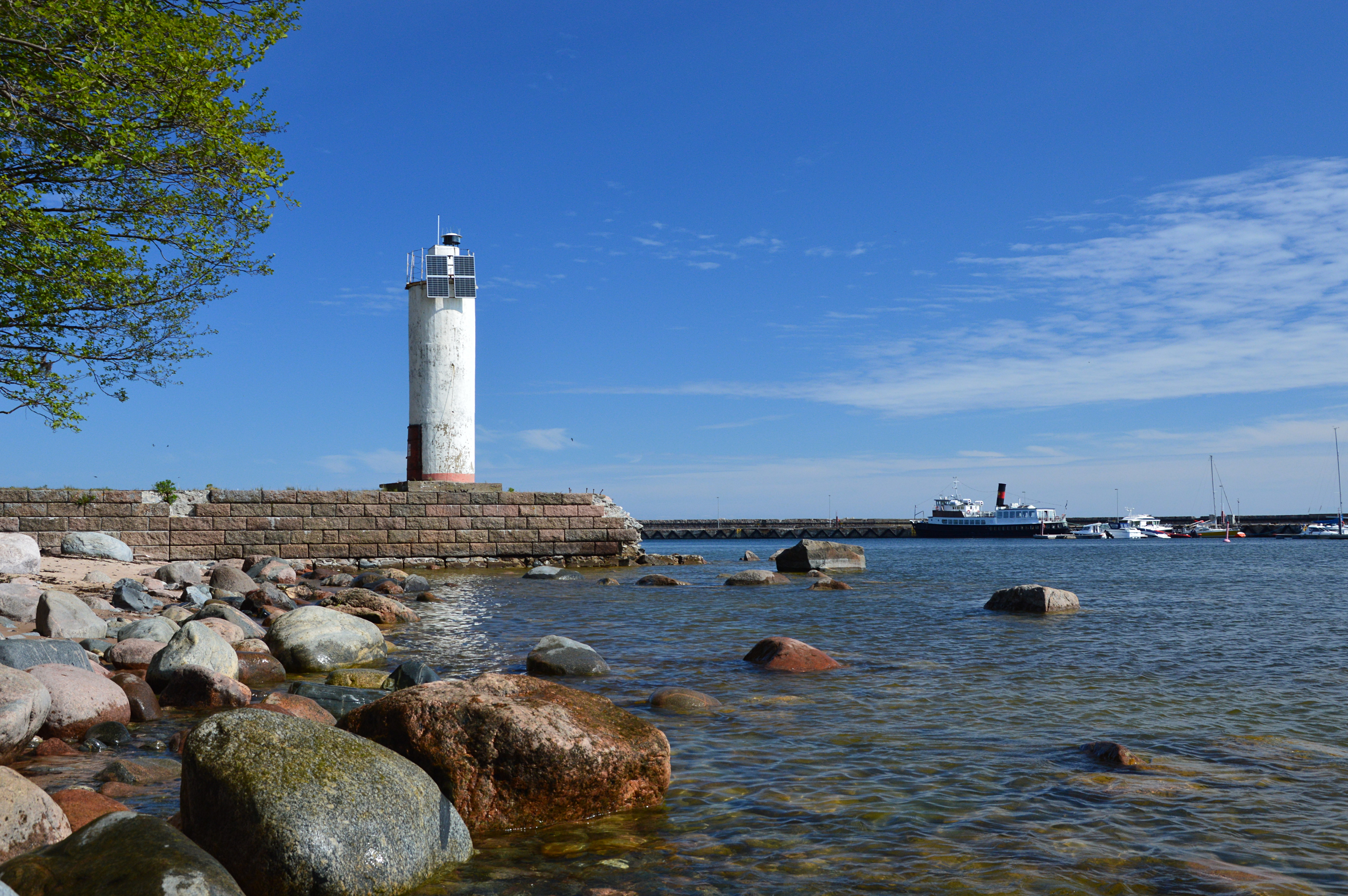
Naissaare harbour light beacon

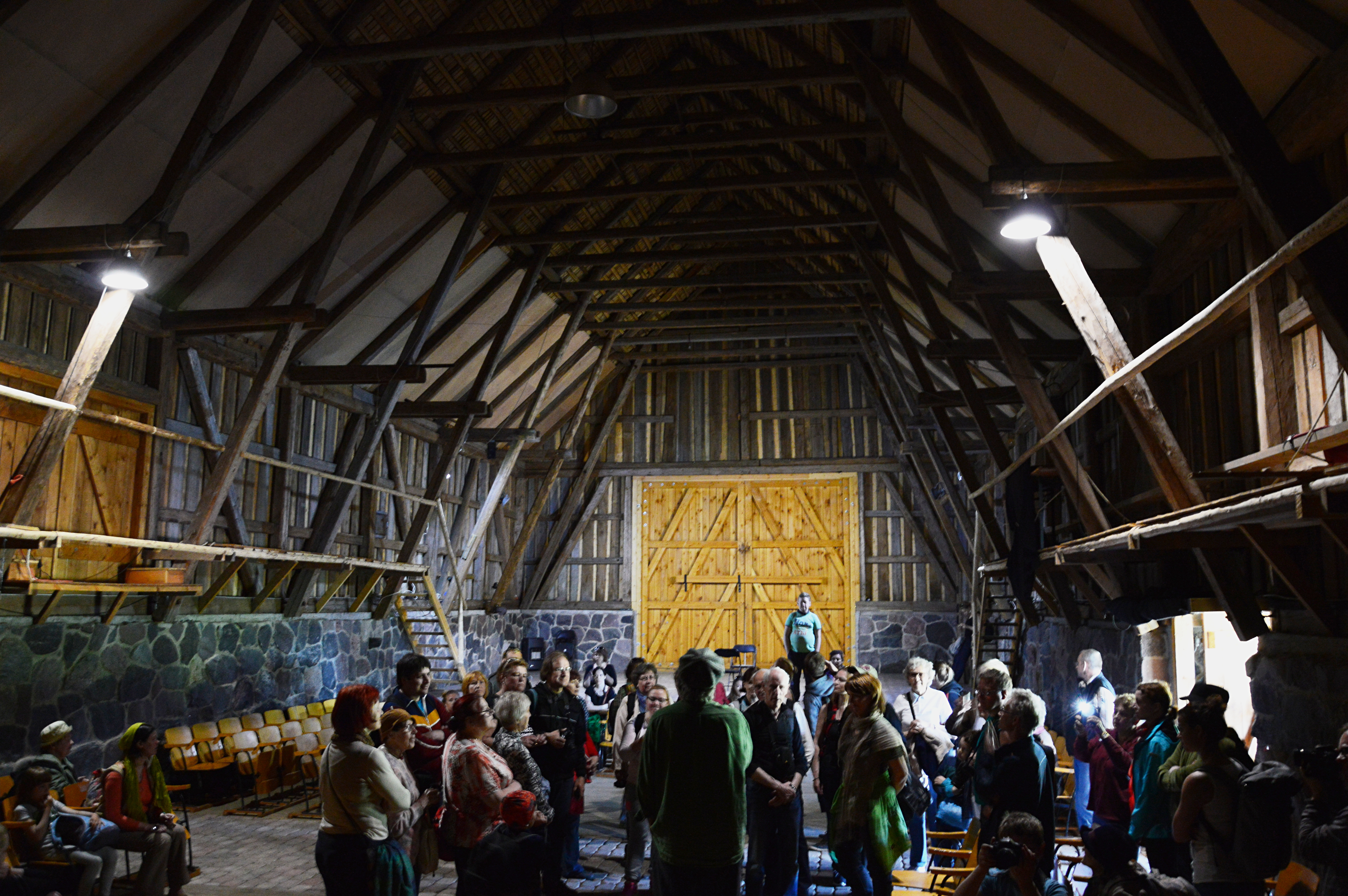
Omari barn

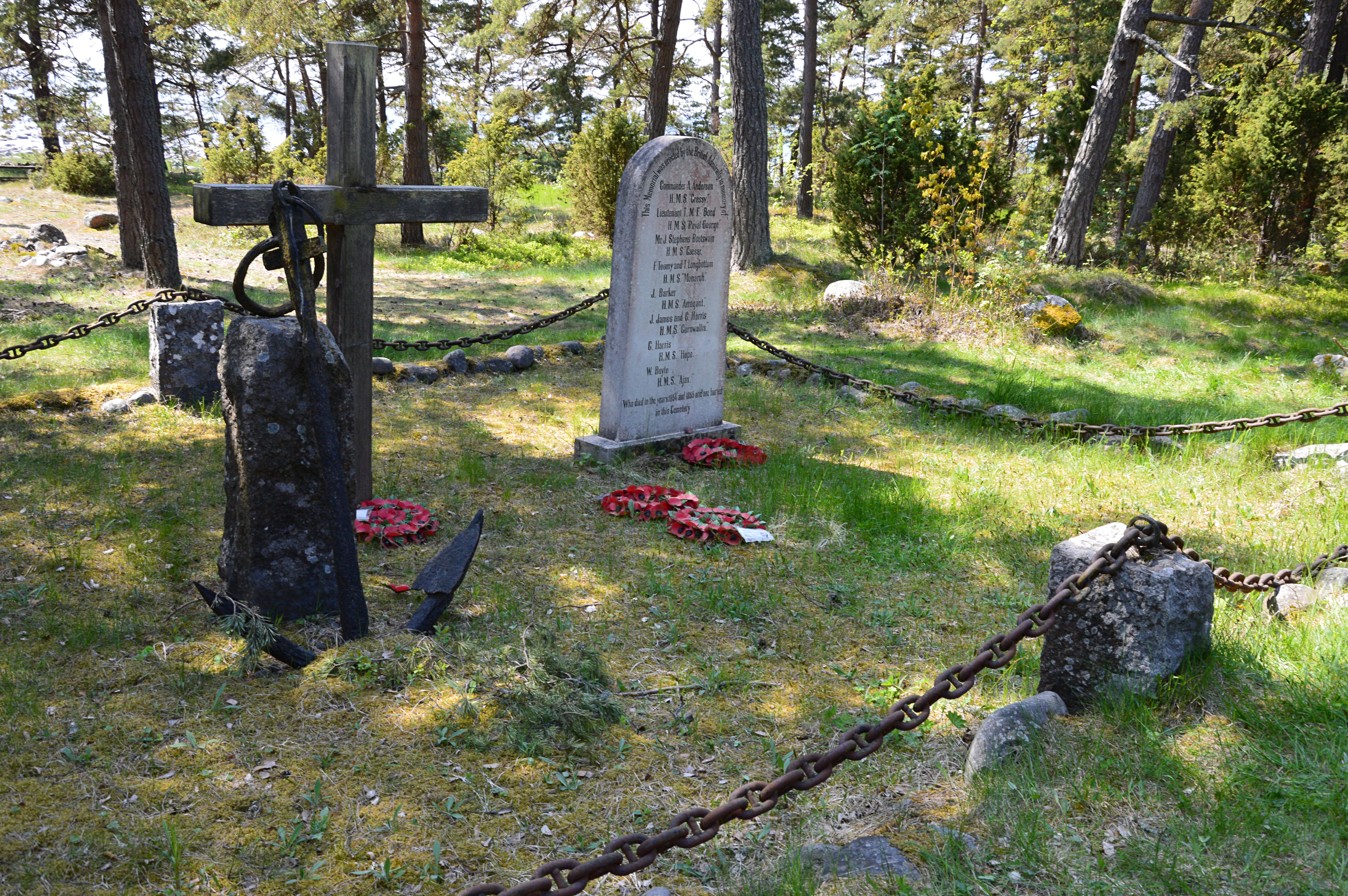
Memorial stone in cemetery

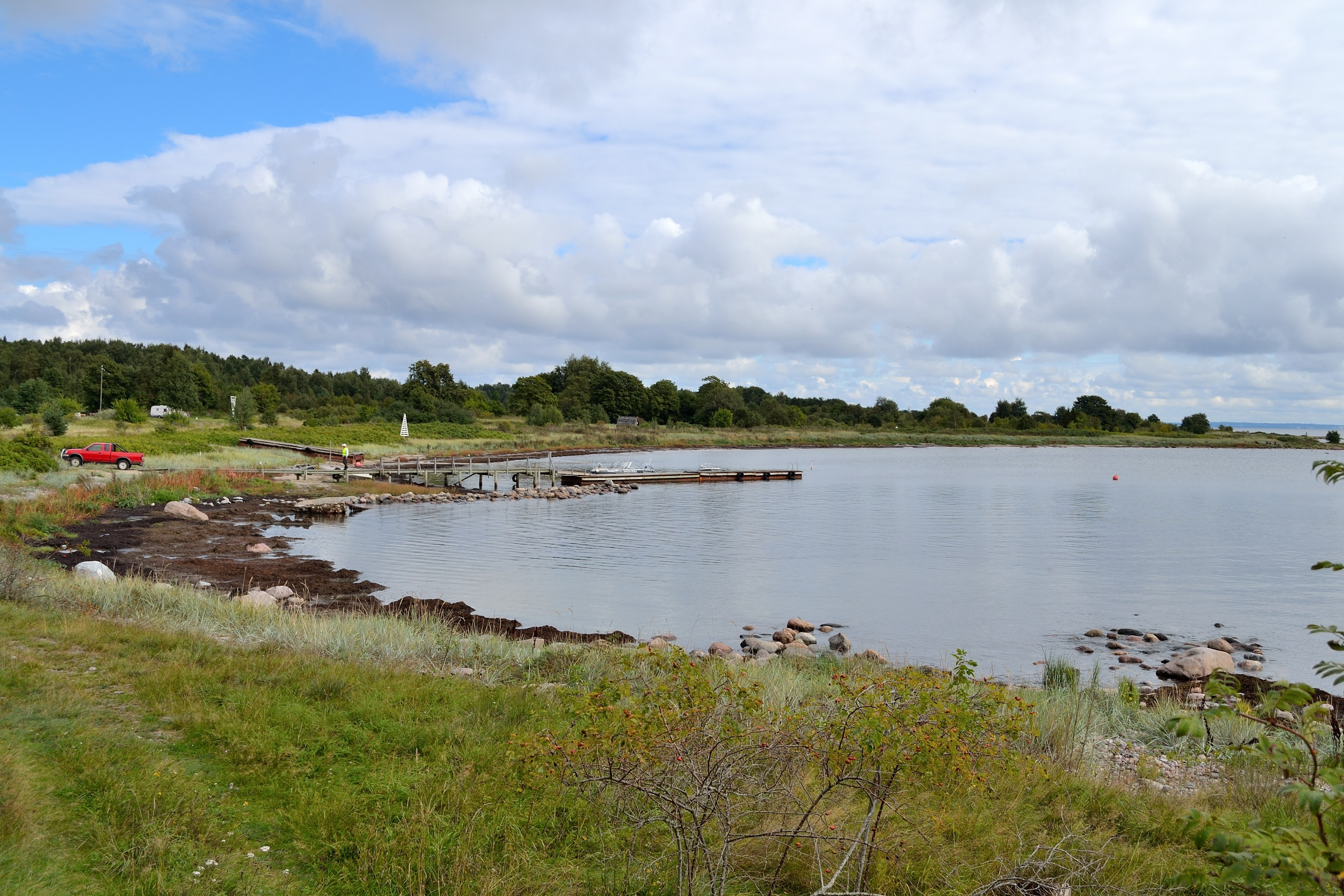
South coast of Naissaar

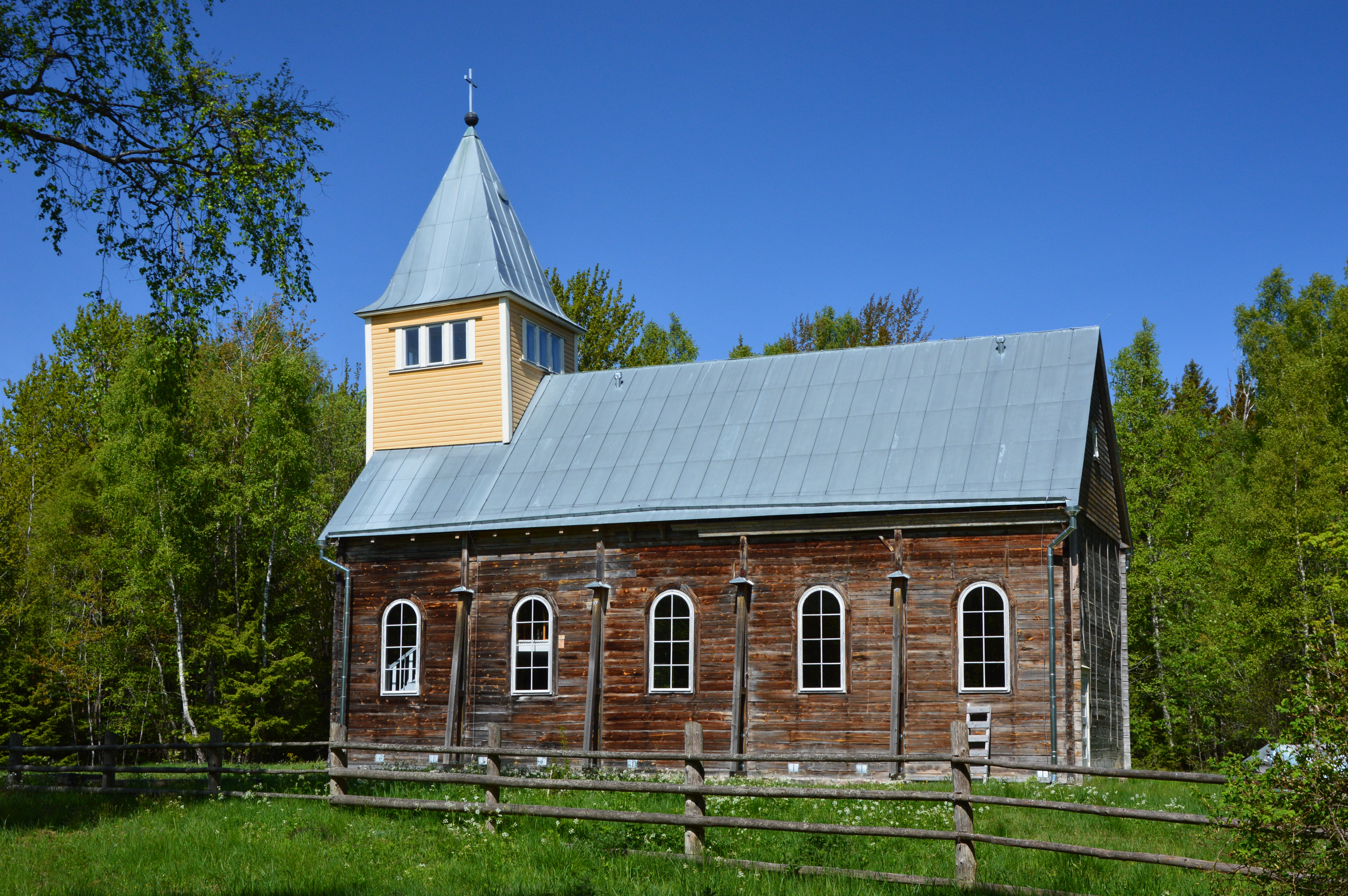
Naissaare Church
