= Mäkiluoto =

Island in Kirkkonummi, Finland

Coordinates: 59°55.1′N 24°20.9′E

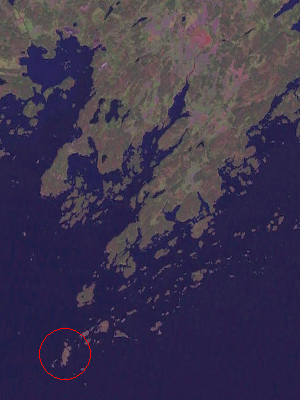

Mäkiluoto or Mac Elliot (Swedish: Makilo) is a Finnish island in the Gulf of Finland, just to the south of Porkkala peninsula. It is part of Kirkkonummi municipality. The whole island is an unmanned military installation and access for civilians is heavily restricted. A number of coastal artillery guns are emplaced there.

The name "Mac Elliott", used in 19th and early 20th centuries, is associated with two apocryphal stories about a person with this name, either shipwrecked or landed on the island.
