= 1940 in aviation =

This is a list of aviation-related events from 1940:

== Events ==
- The Consolidated Aircraft Corporation absorbs the Hall Aluminum Aircraft Corporation.
- Transcontinental and Western Air inaugurates the world's first in-flight audio entertainment for airline passengers, who have individual receivers with which to listen to commercial radio broadcasts.

=== January ===
- The Soviets use observation balloons to pinpoint the locations of Finnish artillery emplacements and bunkers during the month, which is a static period of the Winter War between the Soviet Union and Finland. The Soviet Air Force engages in almost continuous bombardment of Finnish ground positions.
- The German Luftwaffe's chief of intelligence, Colonel Josef "Beppo" Schmid, reports that the British Royal Air Force and French Air Force are "clearly inferior in strength and armament in comparison to the Luftwaffe," that even an entry into World War II by the United States would not alone improve the status of Allied air power during 1940, and that British fighters stood little chance in combat with the German Messerschmitt Bf 110 twin-engine fighter.
- January 6 – Finnish Air Force Lieutenant Jorma Sarvanto shoots down six Soviet Ilyushin DB-3 bombers out of a formation of seven in four minutes.
- January 10 – A German Luftwaffe Messerschmitt Bf 108 Taifun liaison aircraft carrying a copy of Case Yellow, the German plan for a proposed attack on neutral Belgium and the Netherlands, strays off course into Belgium and crash-lands near Mechelen-sur-Meuse. The Belgians communicate the plans to the Netherlands, France, and the United Kingdom, although the resulting international crisis soon dies down.
- January 19 – The first flight from Dublin Airport in the Republic of Ireland takes place. The flight is to Liverpool, England.

=== February ===
- February 1 – The Soviets begin a new ground offensive in Finland, supported by about 500 bombers.
- February 28 – Germany begins the scrapping of the second Graf Zeppelin-class aircraft carrier, Flugzeugträger B, while she still is incomplete on the building ways. Scrapping is completed four months later.
- February 29
  - An attack by 40 Polikarpov I-153 and Polikarpov I-16 fighters on the Finnish Air Force airfield at Ruokalahti is the most successful Soviet Air Force strike of the Winter War. Surprising the Finns on the ground, the Soviets shoot down three Gloster Gladiators as they try to get airborne and shoot down two more Gladiators and a Fokker D.XXI in an ensuring dogfight, losing only one I-16 in exchange.
  - The Finnish government asks the United Kingdom and France to send 100 bombers with crews and bombs to Finland at once to assist in the war with the Soviet Union.

=== March ===
- The United States begins construction of a U.S. Navy seaplane base at Midway Atoll.
- March 2 – The United Kingdom and France promise to send 100 bombers with crews and bombs to assist Finland at once, but do not follow through on the promise.
- March 6 – France informs the Finnish government that it will dispatch an expeditionary force including 72 bombers to Finland on March 13, but the Winter War ends before the French force can begin its journey.
- March 13 – The Winter War between the Soviet Union and Finland ends in the defeat of Finland. During the 3 1/2-month war, the Finnish Air Force has grown from 96 to 287 aircraft, and has lost 62 aircraft in air-to-air combat and 59 more damaged beyond repair, while the Soviet Union has lost between 700 and 900 – 725 confirmed destroyed and about 200 unconfirmed – of the 2,500 to 3,000 aircraft it has committed to the campaign, and another 300 damaged. The Soviet Air Force has dropped 150,000 bombs – about 7,500 tons (6,803 tonnes/metric tons) of bombs – on Finnish territory, but has performed poorly; its operations in early December 1939 had failed to disrupt Finnish mobilization and, despite unusually clear weather in January and February, it failed to disrupt the lone railroad connecting Finland with the outside world for more than a few hours at a time or to disrupt Finnish merchant shipping, despite 60 air raids on Finnish ports.
- March 16 – The United Kingdom suffers its first civilian air-raid casualties of World War II during a raid by the Luftwaffe's Kampfgeschwader 26 on Scapa Flow.
- March 19–20 (overnight) – Royal Air Force Bomber Command conducts its first attack of World War II against a land target, when 20 Hampdens and 30 Whitleys strike the German seaplane base at Hörnum on the island of Sylt. One Whitley is lost.
- March 25 – The United States Government grants permission to American aircraft manufacturers to sell advanced combat aircraft to countries fighting the Axis powers.

=== April ===
- For the second time, U.S. Army Air Corps bombers from Oahu bomb lava tubes to try to prevent lava from an eruption of Mauna Loa from reaching Hilo in the Territory of Hawaii. The bombing fails, although the lava stops naturally before reaching Hilo.
- April 9 – Germany invades Denmark and Norway, making extensive use of paratroops. RAF Bomber Command is ordered to halt the German advance through southern Norway; the missions require 1,000-mile (1,600 km) round trips, almost entirely over the North Sea.
- April 10
  - German Dornier Do 17s and Heinkel He 111s attack British towns and shore facilities in the Scapa Flow area in the Orkney Islands. Defending Gloster Sea Gladiators of the Fleet Air Arm's No. 804 Squadron shoot down one He 111.
  - Sixteen Royal Navy Fleet Air Arm Blackburn Skua dive bombers sink the German light cruiser Königsberg at Bergen, Norway. It is the first time in history that dive bombers sink a major warship. One Skua is lost.
- April 11 – The first aerial torpedo attack of World War II and the first coordinated torpedo attack launched from an aircraft carrier in history takes place, as Fairey Swordfish torpedo bombers from the British aircraft carrier HMS Furious attack two German destroyers in Trondheimsfjord, Norway. The torpedoes all ground in the shallows and no hits are achieved; three aircraft are lost.
- April 12 – RAF Bomber Command loses six Hampdens and three Wellingtons in a daylight raid against German forces at Stavanger, Norway. It is the last daylight raid by the two types of aircraft in northwestern Europe.
- April 13 – During the Second Battle of Narvik, a Swordfish floatplane from the British battleship HMS Warspite sinks the German submarine U-64 in Herjangsfjorden off Bjerkvik, Norway, the first time that a Royal Navy aircraft sinks an enemy submarine during World War II. The Swordfish spots gunfire for Warspite and ships accompanying her in Ofotfjord, resulting in the destruction of seven German destroyers, and finishes off one of the destroyers with a bombing attack.
- April 13–14 (overnight) – The Royal Air Force begins deploying sea mines in Germany's coastal waters.
- April 24 – The British aircraft carrier HMS Glorious flies off the Gloster Gladiators of the Royal Air Force's No. 263 Squadron for service ashore in Norway. The Gladiators then operate from a landing strip on Lesjaskogsvatnet, a lake near Åndalsnes.
- April 25 – Oberfeldwebel Hermann Förster becomes the first German night fighter pilot to shoot down a British bomber during World War II. Flying a Messerschmitt Bf 109D-1, he downs a Handley Page Hampden laying naval mines off the coast of Schleswig-Holstein.
- April 25 – Swordfish and Skuas from the British aircraft carriers HMS Ark Royal and HMS Glorious raid targets in the Trondheim area in Norway.
- April 28 – Aircraft from HMS Ark Royal raid the Trondheim area, causing considerable damage to the German-held airfield at Vaernes, Norway.

=== May ===
- The Imperial Japanese Navy's air arm begins Operation 101, the largest aerial offensive of the Second Sino-Japanese War to date, seeking to destroy Nationalist Chinese air capabilities in Sichuan province and military facilities around Chongqing. It continues until the end of the summer, and will involve 3,715 sorties in 182 raids and the dropping of over 2,000 tons (1,814,388 kg) of bombs.
- Germany suspends construction of the aircraft carrier Graf Zeppelin. It will not resume until May 1942.
- Helen Richey obtains a flight instructor's certificate and begins training United States Army Air Corps cadets – the only woman to do so – at Pittsburgh-Butler Airport in Butler, Pennsylvania.
- May 1 – German aircraft attack the British aircraft carrier HMS Glorious off Norway. Her embarked Gloster Sea Gladiators defend her.
- May 5 – The British aircraft carrier HMS Ark Royal begins a week and a half of support to Allied forces in the Narvik area of Norway.
- May 10 – Germany invades France, the Netherlands, Belgium, and Luxembourg. Paratroops again play a key role. German aircraft surprise aircraft of the Royal Air Force's Advanced Air Striking Force on the ground, but inflict only light damage. Thirty-three Blenheims attack German transport aircraft and other targets in the Netherlands, losing three aircraft. At noon, 32 Fairey Battles attack German ground forces in Luxembourg, losing 13 aircraft shot down and the rest damaged; a second raid by 32 Battles sees the loss of 10 more aircraft. During the day, the Dutch Air Force loses about half its aircraft and the Belgian Air Force about a quarter of its planes, a combined total of more than 100 planes; France loses four of its 879 combat-ready planes destroyed on the ground and 30 damaged, while the Royal Air Force loses six planes destroyed and 12 put out of action out of 384 deployed in France. Dutch and Belgian aircraft and anti-aircraft guns shoot down 230 German planes including most of Germany's transport aircraft, and Germany loses 44 more aircraft to French and British forces over France. The Germans are the first to use military gliders in action in the Battle of Fort Eben-Emael when 41 DFS 230 gliders each carrying ten soldiers are launched behind Junkers Ju 52s. Ten gliders land on the grassed roof of the fortress. Only twenty minutes after landing the force has neutralized the fortress at a cost of six dead and twenty wounded.
- May 11–12 (overnight) – British bombers interdict German Army troop movement as 37 Handley Page Hampdens and Armstrong Whitworth Whitleys bomb road and rail junctions near Mönchengladbach. Three British bombers are lost.
- May 13 – The Sikorsky VS-300, which made its first flight the previous year, makes its first untethered flight.
- May 14
  - The Allies lose 110 aircraft – 70 British Fairey Battles and Bristol Blenheims and forty French planes – on one day in a disastrous attempt to bomb bridges over the River Meuse.
  - Fifty-three German Heinkel He 111 bombers drop nearly 100 tons of bombs on Rotterdam in the Netherlands. The attack kills nearly 1,000 people, destroys 20,000 buildings, and leaves 78,000 people homeless.
- May 15 – During British evacuation and demolition operations in Dutch ports, German dive bombers attack the British destroyer HMS Valentine, which is beached and wrecked at the mouth of the Scheldt.
- May 15–16 (overnight) – RAF Bomber Command conducts its first strategic bombing raid of World War II, as 99 Hampden, Whitley, and Vickers Wellington bombers strike German targets in the Ruhr Valley. One British bomber is lost.
- May 17–18 (overnight) – 72 British bombers attack Bremen, Cologne, and Hamburg, killing at least 47 and injuring 127 in Bremen and Hamburg.
- May 18
  - French Air Force pilot Roger Sauvage scores his first aerial victory, setting a German Heinkel He 111 afire over France, forcing it to land north of Fismes and capturing its two surviving crewmen. He will go on to become history's only black ace, with 16 kills by the end of World War II.
  - The British aircraft carrier HMS Glorious flies off Fleet Air Arm Supermarine Walrus flying boats of No. 701 Squadron for service at Harstad, Norway.
- May 19 – During British naval operations to bring refugees from Ostend, Belgium, to the United Kingdom, German bombers sink the British destroyer HMS Whitley off Belgium.
- May 21 – The British aircraft carriers HMS Glorious and HMS Furious fly off Royal Air Force aircraft for service ashore at Bardufoss, Norway, with Glorious delivering the Hurricanes of No. 46 Squadron and Furious the Gladiators of No. 263 Squadron.
- May 24
  - Adolf Hitler endorses the "Halt Order", stopping the German ground advance in France against Allied forces surrounded at Dunkirk to allow the Luftwaffe to finish them off. He does not rescind the order until May 26.
  - German bombers sink the British destroyer HMS Wessex off Calais and damage a British and a Polish destroyer while they support British troops fighting there.
- May 24 – South African Airways suspends all flight operations. It will resume after World War II concludes in 1945.
- May 25 – HMS Illustrious enters service with the Royal Navy as the world's first fully armored aircraft carrier.
- May 26 – June 4 – Operation Dynamo, the Dunkirk evacuation, takes place, as 308,888 Allied soldiers are evacuated to the United Kingdom from Dunkirk by sea under continuous German air attack. During the evacuation, German aircraft sink six British and three French destroyers and eight personnel ships and put 19 British destroyers and nine personnel ships out of action.
- May 27–28 (overnight) – 120 British bombers attack Bremen, Hamburg, Duisburg, Dortmund, Neuss, and other German cities. During the raid, Aircraftman Stan Oldridge, rear gunner of a Whitley of No. 10 Squadron, scores the first aerial victory of World War II over a German night fighter, shooting down what is probably a Messerschmitt Bf 109D near Utrecht early on May 28.

=== June ===
- June 3 – The German Luftwaffe conducts Operation Paula, a major attack by 640 bombers and 460 fighters intended to finish off the remaining units of the French Air Force by attacking French airfields, factories, railways, and marshalling yards. The French are warned of the attack by Allied codebreakers, but because of communication problems only 80 French fighters take off to oppose the incoming German planes. The Germans lose only four bombers and six fighters and believe that they have dealt a death blow to the French Air Force, claiming 75 French aircraft destroyed in the air and 400 on the ground, as well as the destruction of many factories and railroad facilities. Actually, they destroy only 15 French aircraft in the air and 20 on the ground and inflict little lasting damage on other targets. During the day, the Germans bomb Paris for the first time in World War II.
- June 4
  - BOAC commences a twice-weekly service between the United Kingdom and Portugal, scheduled to connect with Pan American Airways flights from Lisbon to New York City.
  - The first Allied forces begin to withdraw from Norway, covered by aircraft from the British aircraft carrier HMS Ark Royal.
- June 7 – HMS Ark Royal brings aboard the five surviving Supermarine Walrus flying boats of No. 701 Squadron from Harstad and HMS Glorious the surviving Hurricanes of No. 46 Squadron and Gladiators of No. 263 Squadron from Bardufoss as the Allied evacuation from Norway continues.
- June 7–8 (overnight) – The French Naval Aviation SNCAC NC.223 bomber Jules Verne (registration F-ARIN), conducts the first bombing raid on Berlin of World War II, making a 22-hour flight that involves flying over Denmark to approach Berlin from the Baltic Sea. Targeting the Siemens factory, Jules Verne drops eight 250 kg (550 lb) high-explosive bombs and twelve 10 kg (22 lb) incendiary bombs on the city.
- June 8 – The German battlecruisers Scharnhorst and Gneisenau surprise the aircraft carrier HMS Glorious with no aircraft aloft while she is making a voyage from Norway to the United Kingdom and sink her and her two escorting destroyers with gunfire. The Royal Navy and Royal Air Force lose 1,472 men aboard Glorious and the two destroyers; only 43 men survive.
- June 10 – Italy declares war on the United Kingdom and France. The Italian Royal Air Force (Regia Aeronautica) and Italian Royal Navy (Regia Marina) begin the "Siege of Malta", starting with repeated bombing of the island, which is defended in the air only by Gloster Gladiator biplanes of Hal Far Fighter Flight.
- June 10–11 (overnight) – The French Naval Aviation SNCAC NC.223 bomber Jules Verne bombs the Heinkel factory at Rostock, Germany.
- June 11 – "Haddock Force" – two squadrons of RAF Bomber Command Wellingtons tasked to bomb Italy from bases around Marseille, France – attempts to launch its first raid. It fails when French soldiers block the runways after local French officials oppose the raid. Haddock Force is disbanded and returns to the United Kingdom the next day.
- June 11–12 (overnight)
  - RAF Bomber Command raids Italy for the first time, when 36 Whitleys set out to attack industrial targets in Turin; 23 turn back over the Alps and two others bomb Genoa, but nine succeed in attacking Turin.
  - The French Naval Aviation SNCAC NC.223 bomber Jules Verne bombs an oil refinery near Livorno, Italy.
- June 12–13 (overnight) – The French Naval Aviation SNCAC NC.223 bomber Jules Verne bombs an industrial complex south of Venice, Italy.
- June 13 – Fifteen Fleet Air Arm Blackburn Skuas of No. 800 and No. 803 squadrons from HMS Ark Royal join Royal Air Force Bristol Beaufort torpedo bombers escorted by Bristol Blenheim fighters in attacking Scharnhorst and other German warships anchored in Trondheimsfjord, Norway. After the Beauforts attack earlier than planned, the Skuas encounter heavy antiaircraft fire during their attack, and eight are shot down.
- June 14
  - Two Soviet Ilyushin DB-3T bombers shoot down the Finnish Aero O/Y Junkers Ju 52 airliner Kaleva shortly after it takes off from Tallinn, Estonia. It crashes into the Gulf of Finland, killing all nine people on board, including American diplomatic clerk Henry W. Antheil Jr., the younger brother of composer George Antheil.
  - SCADTA and SACO merge to form the Colombian national airline, Avianca.
- June 15–18 – Royal Air Force fighter cover allows the evacuation by sea from France to the United Kingdom of 52,104 troops from Cherbourg Naval Base and St. Malo, France, without loss.
- June 16 – Twelve Breda Ba.88 Lince aircraft of the Regia Aeronautica (Italian Royal Air Force)'s 19° Gruppo Autonomo bomb and strafe the principle French airfields on Corsica.
- June 17 – German aircraft bomb the British ocean liner RMS Lancastria in Quiberon Bay after she has taken aboard 5,800 Allied troops for evacuation from France to the United Kingdom. She catches fire and sinks in 15 minutes, with the loss of 3,000 lives.
- June 18 – The last deployed element of the RAF's Advanced Air Striking Force – some Hurricane fighters – withdraws from France and the Channel Islands to the United Kingdom.
- June 19
  - British Fleet Air Arm Fairey Swordfish biplane torpedo bombers of No. 767 Squadron operating from a base in southern France raid Genoa, Italy, and Italian lines of communication. It is the Royal Navy's first air raid on Italian soil of World War II. The craft go on to join the defence in the Siege of Malta.
  - Nine Italian Breda Ba.88 Lince aircraft attack French airfields on Corsica.
- June 21 – Six Fleet Air Arm Swordfish biplane torpedo bombers of No. 821 and No. 823 squadrons based at Royal Naval Air Station Hatston attempt to attack Scharnhorst as she steams from Trondheimsfjord, Norway, to Kiel, Germany. They score no hits, and two Swordfish are shot down.
- June 22
  - France surrenders to Germany.
  - General Albert Kesselring directs Hauptmann Wolfgang Falck to establish the Luftwaffe's first true night fighter unit, Nachtjagdgeschwader 1. It is the birth of the German specialized night fighter force of World War II.
- June 26 – The Royal Air Force disbands the Advanced Air Striking Force. Since the German offensive in the West began on May 10, the AASF has lost 229 aircraft.
- June 28 – Italian antiaircraft guns shoot down an Italian Air Force Savoia-Marchetti SM.79 carrying Marshal of the Air Force, Governor-General of Libya, and Commander-in-Chief of Italian North Africa Italo Balbo after it tries to land at Tobruk, Libya, just after a raid by British Bristol Blenheim bombers. Balbo and everyone else aboard the plane dies.
- June 30 – The United States Army Air Corps suspends all instruction at the Air Corps Tactical School at Maxwell Field, Alabama. Although the school survives with a caretaker staff until June 1942, instruction of students never resumes.
- Late June – The British aircraft carrier HMS Argus delivers Fleet Air Arm Supermarine Walrus flying boats of No. 701 Squadron to Iceland, where they will begin antisubmarine and reconnaissance patrols following the British occupation of Iceland to preempt any possible German invasion of the island.

=== July ===
- July 3
  - British bombers make a daylight attack against German barges assembling at Rotterdam in anticipation of an invasion of the United Kingdom, their first attack against German efforts to build an invasion force. Such raids will peak in September and end in October after the threat of a German invasion abates.
  - During the British attack on the French fleet at Mers-el-Kébir, Algeria, Fairey Swordfish aircraft from the aircraft carrier HMS Ark Royal mine the harbor and unsuccessfully attack the French battlecruiser Strasbourg as she flees to Toulon. French Curtiss Hawk 75 fighters and Blackburn Skua fighters from Ark Royal engage in a dogfight, during which the French shoot down one Skua.
- July 4
  - In retaliation for the British attack at Mers-el-Kébir, French Air Force bombers raid Gibraltar, causing little damage.
  - Pan American Airways introduces the Boeing 307 Stratoliner, the first pressurized airliner to enter service, primarily serving Miami and Latin America.
- July 5 – Shore-based Swordfish of the Fleet Air Arm's No. 813 Squadron make a torpedo strike against Italian ships at Tobruk, sinking a transport and a destroyer, blowing the bow off another destroyer, and damaging an ocean liner.
- July 6 – Twelve Swordfish aircraft from Ark Royal make a torpedo strike against Mers-el-Kébir, sinking a French patrol boat and badly damaging the beached battlecruiser Dunkerque. It is the most successful aerial torpedo attack against a capital ship in history at the time.
- July 8
  - Kemayoran Airport opens in Batavia in the Netherlands East Indies.
  - Aircraft from the British aircraft carrier HMS Hermes torpedo the French battleship Richelieu at Dakar, Senegal, damaging her. Richelieu is not seaworthy again for a year.
  - Transcontinental and Western Air inaugurates coast-to-coast service across the United States with the Boeing 307 Stratoliner. The cross-country trip takes 13 hours 40 minutes.
- July 8–9 (overnight) – 64 British bombers strike airfields in the Netherlands and ports in north Germany and lay sea mines. Germany's first specialized night fighter unit, Nachtjagdgeschwader 1, scores its first victory, as Oberfeldwebel Hermann Förster shoots down a Whitley off Heligoland.
- July 8–13 – Italian high-level bombers subject ships of the British Mediterranean Fleet to repeated heavy attacks while the fleet is at sea in the Mediterranean. They score only one hit, on the light cruiser HMS Gloucester.
- July 9
  - The indecisive Battle of Calabria is the first major fleet action of World War II between the British and Italian navies. Swordfish from the British aircraft carrier HMS Eagle conduct two torpedo strikes but score no hits.
  - 40 Italian Savoia-Marchetti SM.79 bombers attack the British aircraft carrier HMS Ark Royal and other ships of Force H off Sardinia. They drop over 100 bombs but score no hits, and Blackburn Skuas from Ark Royal shoot down two SM.79s and damage two others.
- July 10 – The Battle of Britain commences with the first German attacks on British convoys in the English Channel.
- July 14 – In retaliation for the British attacks at Mers-el-Kébir and Dakar, French bombers again attack Gibraltar, but most of their bombs fall into the sea.
- July 15 – Over strong protests by Pan American Airways president Juan Trippe, President Franklin D. Roosevelt approves a seven-year temporary certificate permitting American Export Airlines to begin transatlantic service, providing flights between New York City and Lisbon, Portugal, using Sikorsky VS-44 flying boats.
- July 20 – Fleet Air Arm Swordfish of No. 813 Squadron conduct another torpedo strike against Tobruk, sinking two Italian destroyers.
- July 25–26 (overnight) – 166 British bombers strike German airfields in the Netherlands and targets in the Ruhr.
- July 29 – The Soviet Union cancels the Polikarpov SPB (D) twin-engine dive bomber program in favor of the Petlyakov Pe-2.
- Late July – In the first use of airborne radar for interception of an enemy aircraft, a Flying Officer Ashfield flying a British Bristol Blenheim IF night fighter destroys a German Dornier Do 17 bomber. A second such kill will not be achieved until November – again by Ashfield.

=== August ===
- August 2 – As one of the components of Operation Hurry, the first of many operations in which Allied aircraft carriers fly off Royal Air Force fighters for service at Malta, twelve Fairey Swordfish from the British aircraft carrier HMS Ark Royal make the first night raid on Italian soil in the early morning hours, attacking Cagliari in southern Sardinia. They inflict heavy damage on the airfield and on Italian seaplanes anchored in the harbor and drop naval mines into the harbor. Two Swordfish are lost. Nine accompanying Blackburn Skuas shoot down an Italian Cant Z.501. It is a diversionary attack to cover the carrier HMS Argus, which flies off 12 RAF Hawker Hurricanes to Malta from a point south of Sardinia later in the day.
- August 12–23 – The German Air Force (Luftwaffe) conducts Operation Eagle Attack (Adlerangriff), targeting British radar stations, inland RAF Fighter Command airfields, and Royal Air Force communication centers during the Battle of Britain.
- August 13 – A Royal Australian Air Force Lockheed Hudson crashes near Canberra, Australia, killing all 10 people on board. Among the dead are Geoffrey Street, Australian Minister of Defence and Repatriation; James Fairbairn, Australian Minister for Air and Civil Aviation; Sir Henry Gullett, Australian Vice-President of the Executive Council and Minister in Charge of Scientific and Industrial Research; and General Sir Brudenell White, Australian Chief of the General Staff.
- August 15 – The heaviest fighting of the Battle of Britain occurs, with the loss of 46 British and 76 German aircraft.
- August 18 – "The Hardest Day" in the Battle of Britain: both sides lose more aircraft combined on this day than at any other point during the campaign without the Luftwaffe achieving dominance over RAF Fighter Command.
- August 19 – The first combat mission of the Imperial Japanese Navy's Mitsubishi A6M Zero (Allied reporting name "Zeke") fighter takes place, as 12 Zeroes escort 54 Mitsubishi G3M (Allied reporting name "Nell") bombers over Chongqing, but no Chinese aircraft rise to meet them.
- August 24 – A German bomber crew bombs a residential area of south London, apparently in error.
- August 25–26 (overnight) – In retaliation for the August 24 bombing of London, the Royal Air Force conducts its first air raid of World War II on Berlin.
- August 27 – The first flight of the motorjet-powered Caproni Campini N.1 takes place. It is recognized as the first flight of a jet aircraft; the recognition later is retracted when news of the August 1939 flight of the turbojet-powered Heinkel He 178 is made public.
- August 29 – The first unit of the Free French Air Force is formed at RAF Oldiham in England.
- August 31
  - Polish 303 Squadron, the most efficient Allied unit of the Battle of Britain, enters action.
  - Pennsylvania Central Airlines Trip 19, a Douglas DC-3A, crashes in a thunderstorm near Short Hill Mountain near Lovettsville, Virginia, killing all 25 people on board. United States Senator Ernest Lundeen of Minnesota is among the dead.

=== September ===
- Imperial Japanese Navy Aichi D3A dive bombers and Nakajima B5N carrier attack bombers begin bombing attacks on Chongqing.
- September 2 – Aircraft from the British aircraft carrier HMS Ark Royal conduct Operation Smash, a night raid on Cagliari, Sardinia. While some Swordfish drop parachute flares, others bomb an Italian military headquarters and aircraft parked on the ground.
- September 3 – Ark Royal aircraft again attack Cagliari in Operation Grab in an attack similar to that of Operation Smash. The raid is less successful, with many bombs falling into the sea.
- September 4
  - Adolf Hitler orders German bombing attacks on London.
  - Aircraft from the British aircraft carrier HMS Illustrious attack Italian airfields on Rhodes.
- September 7 – Hermann Göring orders the German Air Force (Luftwaffe) to stop targeting British airfields and to attack the city of London instead. The Luftwaffe attacks London that evening, the first of 57 consecutive nights of German air raids on London.
- September 7–8 – The largest mass air combat in history takes place over Great Britain, with 1,200 British and German aircraft operating in an area of only 24 km × 48 km (15 mi × 30 mi).
- September 9 – Aircraft from the British aircraft carrier Ark Royal strike Cagliari, Sardinia, inflicting more damage under heavy fire.
- September 10 – The Regia Aeronautica (Italian Royal Air Force) forms the Corpo Aereo Italiano (Italian Air Corps) as an expeditionary force for bombing the United Kingdom alongside the German Luftwaffe from bases in Belgium.
- September 13 – The Imperial Japanese Navy's Mitsubishi A6M Zero fighter scores its first aerial victories, when a flight of Zeroes attacks 27 Nationalist Chinese fighters over Chongqing and claims to have destroyed all of them; actual Chinese losses probably are 13 to 24 aircraft. No Zeroes are lost.
- September 15 – Germany makes its heaviest daylight raid on London. The Royal Air Force destroys 185 German aircraft over England during the day. As a result, Germany abandons its hopes of achieving victory in the Battle of Britain.
- September 17 – Aircraft from the British aircraft carrier HMS Illustrious raid Benghazi, Libya.
- September 17–18 – The world's first high-performance, purpose-built night fighter, the British Bristol Beaufighter, flies its first operational patrols, with the RAF.–
- September 23 – The British aircraft carrier HMS Ark Royal arrives off Dakar, Senegal, with the Free French leader General Charles de Gaulle embarked. She flies off two French Caudron C.270 Luciole trainer aircraft which carry Free French officers ashore to request that Vichy French forces there join de Gaulle on the Allied side, but the Vichy French refuse.
- September 24–26 – A British naval force supports a disastrous Free French attempt at an amphibious invasion of Dakar. Vichy French forces resist successfully, and HMS Ark Royal loses nine Swordfish aircraft before operations are called off.
- September 24–25 – French Air Force bombers raid Gibraltar in retaliation for the British and Free French attack on Dakar.
- September 25 – The bombers of the Corpo Aereo Italiano (Italian Air Corps) arrive at their base in Belgium to participate in the Battle of Britain. The fighters will arrive later.
- September 29 – Two Royal Australian Air Force Avro Ansons of No. 2 Service Flying Training School with two men aboard each plane collide in mid-air over Brocklesby, New South Wales, Australia, and become interlocked with one on top of the other. The engines of the lower aircraft keep running, and the pilot of the upper plane finds he can control the two aircraft using his ailerons and flaps; he lands the planes, still interlocked, safely in a paddock near Brocklesby, and all four men survive with only one of them injured.
- September 30 – The Battle of Britain is said to be over, with Hitler's planned invasion of the United Kingdom (Operation Sea Lion, or Unternehmen Seelöwe) postponed indefinitely. Since September 1, the Royal Air Force has lost 65 bombers.

=== October ===
- The German Luftwaffe begins photographic mapping flights over the western border regions of the Soviet Union.
- Imperial Japanese Navy Mitsubishi G3M (Allied reporting name "Nell") bombers based at Hanoi in French Indochina begin attacks on the Burma Road.
- The British Royal Air Force begins to install IFF Mark II, the first operational identification friend or foe system.
- October 1 – A British bomber is shot down over the Netherlands by German antiaircraft artillery after being illuminated by a searchlight coupled to a Freya radar. It is the first time an aircraft is destroyed after being detected and illuminated by a radar-guided searchlight.
- October 2 – The first ground-radar-controlled aerial victory at night takes place as the Luftwaffe's dunkele Nachtjagd ("dark nightfighting", abbreviated as Dunaja) technique – in which ground-based radar is used to control night fighters until they come within visual range of a target – has its first success. A Freya radar is used to coach the Dorner Do 17Z-10 night fighter pilot to within visual range of a British Vickers Wellington bomber over the Netherlands, allowing him to shoot it down.
- October 8
  - The British Royal Air Force forms No. 71 Squadron, the "Eagle Squadron", comprising American volunteers.
  - Josef František, a Czechoslovak ace (17 victories) and the most efficient Allied pilot of the Battle of Britain, dies in an air crash over England.
- October 14 – Aircraft from the British aircraft carrier HMS Illustrious raid Leros.
- October 20 – During an air show at Marianna, Arkansas, a sightseeing plane circling a parachutist as he descends becomes entangled in his parachute. The plane crashes, killing all five people on board it as well as the parachutist.
- October 24
  - The Luftwaffe's I. Gruppe, Nachtjagdgeschwader 2, scores the first aerial victory by a German night intruder aircraft during World War II with a kill over England.
  - The Regia Aeronautica's (Italian Royal Air Force's) Corpo Aereo Italiano (Italian Air Corps) launches its first bombing raid over England, using 18 Fiat BR.20 bombers.
- October 31 – Since August 1, the Luftwaffe has lost 1,733 aircraft in the Battle of Britain, while the Royal Air Force has lost 915 fighters.

=== November ===
- The United States Department of War separates General Headquarters Air Force (the United States Army's air combat element) from the United States Army Air Corps (responsible for aviation logistics and training).
- November 5
  - Four Royal Air Force squadrons deploy to Greece to support the country against Italian attacks.
  - The U.S. Army Air Corps activates the Hawaiian Air Force, its first air force based outside the continental United States.
- November 6 – The first combat between the Free French Air Force and Vichy French Air Force takes place, when two Vichy aircraft engage two Free French Westland Lysanders near Libreville, French Equatorial Africa. Both Lysanders suffer damage but return to base.
- November 8 – The first Free French airmen are shot down and taken prisoner.
- November 11 – Regular ferry flights of US-built warplanes commence across the Atlantic.
- November 11–12 (overnight) – Fairey Swordfish from HMS Illustrious make a highly successful raid against ships of the Italian Royal Navy (Regia Marina) at Taranto, Italy. The raid damages the battleship Conte di Cavour beyond repair, and extensively damages two others, Littorio and Duilio. It also damages a cruiser and two destroyers, sinks two auxiliary ships, and knocks out seaplane hangars and oil storage tanks. By far the most successful carrier-based air raid against enemy capital ships to date, it is the first time in history that aircraft alone incapacitate an enemy fleet and alter the balance of power at sea unaided.
- November 14–15 (overnight) – 437 aircraft of the German Air Force (Luftwaffe) make a massed air raid on Coventry. 380 civilians are killed and some 800 are wounded.
- November 17 – Operation White, a second attempt by the British aircraft carrier HMS Argus to fly off aircraft – 14 RAF Hawker Hurricanes and two Fleet Air Arm Blackburn Skuas – to Malta fails almost completely when the aircraft are launched at too great a range and become lost in bad weather. Only four Hurricanes and a Skua reach Malta; the other Hurricanes all ditch in the Mediterranean with the loss of all but one of their pilots, and one Skua crashlands on Sicily, where the Italians capture its crew.
- November 19 – Boston-Maine Airways is renamed Northeast Airlines.
- November 27
  - During the Battle of Cape Spartivento, the Italian naval commander Admiral Inigo Campioni orders his fleet to retire upon receiving word of the strength of the opposing British force. A torpedo strike by 11 Swordfish against his fleeing ships is ineffective, as is a belated attack on the British aircraft carrier HMS Ark Royal by Italian high-level bombers.
  - The pioneering French aviator Henri Guillaumet and Jean Chiappe, the new French High Commissioner to the Levant, die when an Italian fighter shoots down their Farman F.220 airliner, named Le Verrier, as Guillaumet pilots it over the Mediterranean Sea carrying Chiappe to Syria.
  - British West Indian Airlines, the future BWIA West Indies Airways, begins flight operations.

=== December ===
- The Soviet Union abandons voluntary recruitment for its military flight training programs and begins to feed personnel into such programs via conscription.
- The French aircraft manufacturer Société nationale des constructions aéronautiques du Midi (SNCA du Midi, or SNCAM), which manufactures aircraft under the Dewoitine name, is absorbed into Société nationale des constructions aéronautiques du Sud-Est (SNCASE), bringing to an end Dewoitine's existence as a business entity and the production of aircraft under its name.
- Early December – Southampton suffers two particularly severe German night bombing raids.
- December 4 – Operational control of RAF Coastal Command is transferred to the Royal Navy, although Coastal Command remains part of the Royal Air Force. Air protection of British merchant shipping soon begins to improve.
- December 12 – The British aircraft carriers HMS Eagle and HMS Illustrious strike Italian transport at Bardia, Libya. Later in the month their aircraft strike Rhodes and Stampalia in Greece and Tripoli in Libya.
- December 16–17 (overnight) – For the first time, Royal Air Force Bomber Command conducts a raid focusing on attacking a city center rather than specific targets in Operation Rachel, a raid by 134 British bombers against Mannheim, Germany, in reprisal for the German raid on Coventry in November. Their bombs are dispersed widely, killing 34 people in Mannheim and Ludwigshafen.
- December 21 – Nine Fairey Swordfish from the British aircraft carrier HMS Illustrious sink two Italian merchant ships off Tunisia with the loss of one Swordfish.
- December 23 – Eddie August Schneider dies in a crash when his plane is clipped by a U.S. Navy bomber at Floyd Bennett Field.
- December 25 – Two British Royal Navy Fleet Air Arm Grumman Martlets of 804 Naval Air Squadron shoot down a German Junkers Ju 88 off Scapa Flow. It is the first aerial victory in Europe by any variant of the Grumman F4F Wildcat.
- December 29–30 (overnight) – The Luftwaffe makes a devastating attack on London, making extensive use of incendiary weapons and causing the Second Great Fire of London with hundreds of casualties.
- December 31 – During 1940, German night fighters defending Germany have shot down 42 British bombers.

== First flights ==
- Bellanca YO-50
- Ikarus Aero 2
- Summer 1940 – Tachikawa Ki-54 (Allied reporting name "Hickory")

=== January ===
- January 4 – Fairey Fulmar production aircraft N1854
- January 13 – Yakovlev Ya-26, prototype of the Yakovlev Yak-1

=== February ===
- Dewoitine HD.730
- February 12 – North American NA-64 Yale
- February 18 – Polikarpov SPB (D)
- February 24 – Hawker Typhoon prototype P5212

=== March ===
- Republic YP-43, prototype of the P-43 Lancer
- March 20 – Armstrong Whitworth Albemarle prototype P1361
- March 30
  - Lavochkin-Gorbunov-Gudkov LaGG-3
  - Potez 230

=== April ===
- April 1 – Grumman XF5F-1 Skyrocket

=== May ===
- May 6 – Dewoitine D.750
- May 13 – Bell XFL-1 Airabonita
- May 18 – SAAB B17
- May 29 – Vought XF4U-1, prototype of the F4U Corsair

=== July ===
- July 15 – Stinson L-1 Vigilant

=== August ===
- Mitsubishi Ki-57
- Nakajima Ki-44 Shoki
- August 3 – Focke-Achgelis Fa 223 (first untethered flight)
- August 28 – Caproni-Campini N.1, thermojet-powered aircraft

=== September ===
- Aichi H9A
- September 1 – North American P-64
- September 7 – Blohm & Voss BV 222
- September 14 – Miles M.20 U-9
- September 22 – Heinkel He 280

=== October ===
- October 12 – Ilyushin TsKB-57, prototype of the Ilyushin Il-2 (NATO reporting name "Bark")
- October 15 – Ilyushin DB-4
- October 18 – Airspeed Fleet Shadower
- October 21 – Beriev KOR-2, later redesignated Beriev Be-4
- October 26 – North American NA-73X, prototype of the P-51 Mustang

=== November ===
- Kawasaki Ki-56
- November 1 – Northrop N-3PB
- November 25
  - de Havilland Mosquito prototype W4050
  - Martin B-26 Marauder
- November 29 – Junkers Ju 288

=== December ===
- Nakajima Ki-58
- Yokosuka D4Y Suisei ("Comet"), Allied reporting name "Judy"
- December 7 – Fairey Barracuda prototype P1767
- December 18 – Curtiss SB2C Helldiver

== Entered service ==
- Fairchild PT-19
- Martin PS-30 with Aeroflot
- North American NA-64 Yale
- Summer 1940 – Kawasaki Ki-48 (Allied reporting name "Lily")
- Autumn 1940 – Blohm & Voss BV 142 with the German Luftwaffe

=== February ===
- Blackburn Roc
- February 24 – Grumman F4F Wildcat with the United States Navy

=== March ===
- Bell YFM-1 Airacuda
- Fairey Albacore with No. 826 Squadron FAA

=== April ===
- Blohm & Voss BV 138 Seedrache (Sea Dragon) with the German Luftwaffe
- April 7 – Amiot 354
- April 12 – Latécoère 611 with the French Navy

=== May ===
- Amiot 351 with the French Air Force
- Amiot 354 with the French Air Force
- Dewoitine D.520 with the French Air Force
- SNCAC NC.223.3 with the French Air Force
- Vought OS2U Kingfisher with the United States Navy

=== June ===
- Brewster F2A Buffalo with United States Navy Fighter Squadron 3 (VF-3) aboard USS Saratoga (CV-3), the first carrier-borne U.S. Navy monoplane fighter
- Lockheed P-38 Lightning – the first twin-engined interceptor fighter in U.S. Army service, the first twin-boom fighter in series production, and the first production fighter with a maximum speed in excess of 400 mph (640 km/h) – with the United States Army Air Corps
- Westland Whirlwind with No. 25 Squadron, Royal Air Force

=== July ===
- Fairey Fulmar with No. 806 Squadron FAA
- Westland Whirlwind with No. 263 Squadron RAF
- July 4 – Boeing 307 Stratoliner makes first commercial flight with Pan American Airways
- July 21 – Mitsubishi A6M Zero (Allied reporting name "Zeke") with the Imperial Japanese Navy's 12th Combined Naval Air Corps

=== September ===
- Bell YP-39 Airacobra with the United States Army Air Corps
- September 1 – Martin PBM Mariner with Patrol Squadron 55 (VP-55), United States Navy
- September 2 – Bristol Beaufighter with No. 25 Squadron, No. 29 Squadron, No. 219 Squadron and No. 604 Squadron RAF

=== October ===
- Curtiss CW-21B with the Royal Netherlands East Indies Army Air Corps

=== November ===
- Naval Aircraft Factory SBN with the United States Navy
- November 1 – Avro Manchester with the Royal Air Force's No. 207 Squadron
- November 13 – Handley Page Halifax with the Royal Air Force's No. 35 Squadron

== Retirements ==
- Berliner Joyce PB-1 (ex-P-16) by the United States Army Air Corps
- Grigorovich IP-1 by the Soviet Air Forces

=== July ===
- Ford RR-5 by the United States Navy, last Ford Trimotor in service with the U.S. Navy or United States Marine Corps.

=== August ===
- August 20 – Levasseur PL.15 by French Naval Aviation
