= Kelnase =

Village in Estonia

Coordinates: 59°38′N 25°01′E

- Village
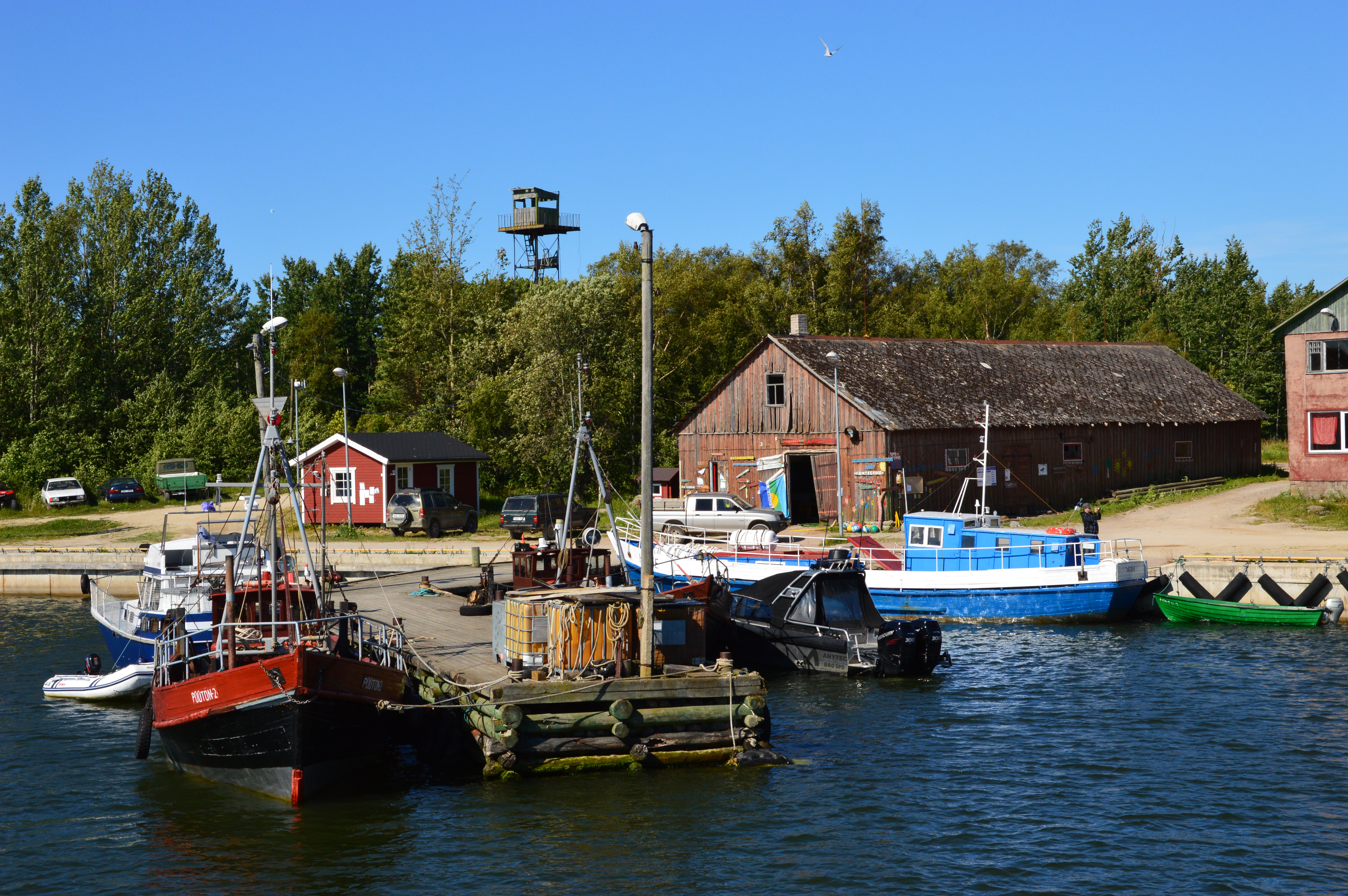
- Kelnase harbour
- Interactive map of Kelnase
- Country: Estonia
- County: Harju County
- Parish: Viimsi Parish
- Time zone: UTC+2 (EET)
  - Summer (DST): UTC+3 (EEST)

Kelnase is a village in Viimsi Parish, Harju County in northern Estonia. Its one of the three villages located on the island of Prangli, the others being Idaotsa and Lääneotsa. Kelnase is the location of the main harbour on the island.

Administratively the island of Keri, located about 6 km north, known for its lighthouse also belongs to Kelnase village.
