= Lääneotsa =

Village in Estonia

Coordinates: 59°37′21″N 25°00′22″E

- Village
- Interactive map of Lääneotsa
- Country: Estonia
- County: Harju County
- Parish: Viimsi Parish
- Time zone: UTC+2 (EET)
  - Summer (DST): UTC+3 (EEST)

Lääneotsa is a village in Viimsi Parish, Harju County in northern Estonia. Its one of the three villages located on the island of Prangli, the others being Idaotsa and Kelnase.

== Gallery ==
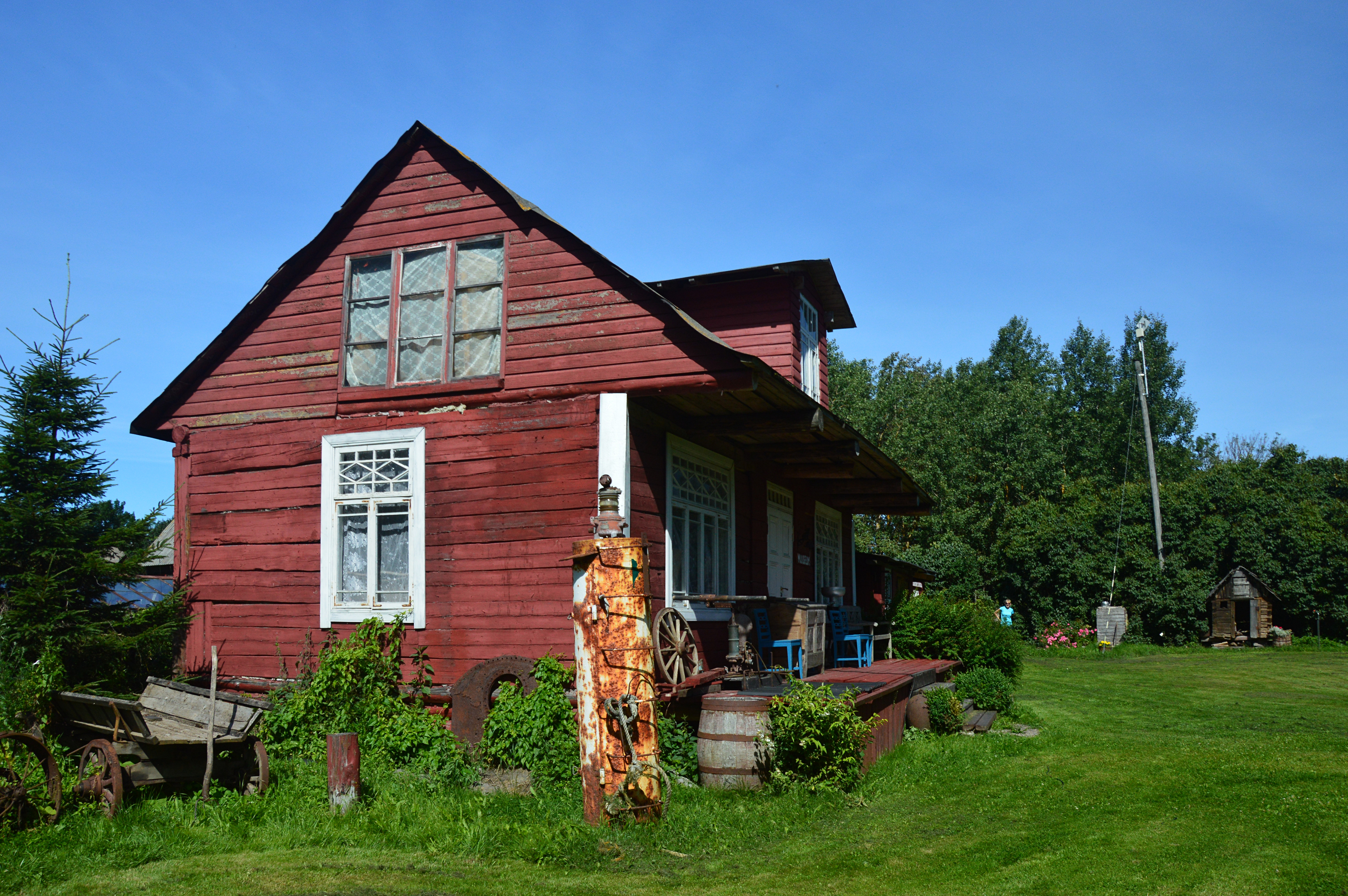
Museum

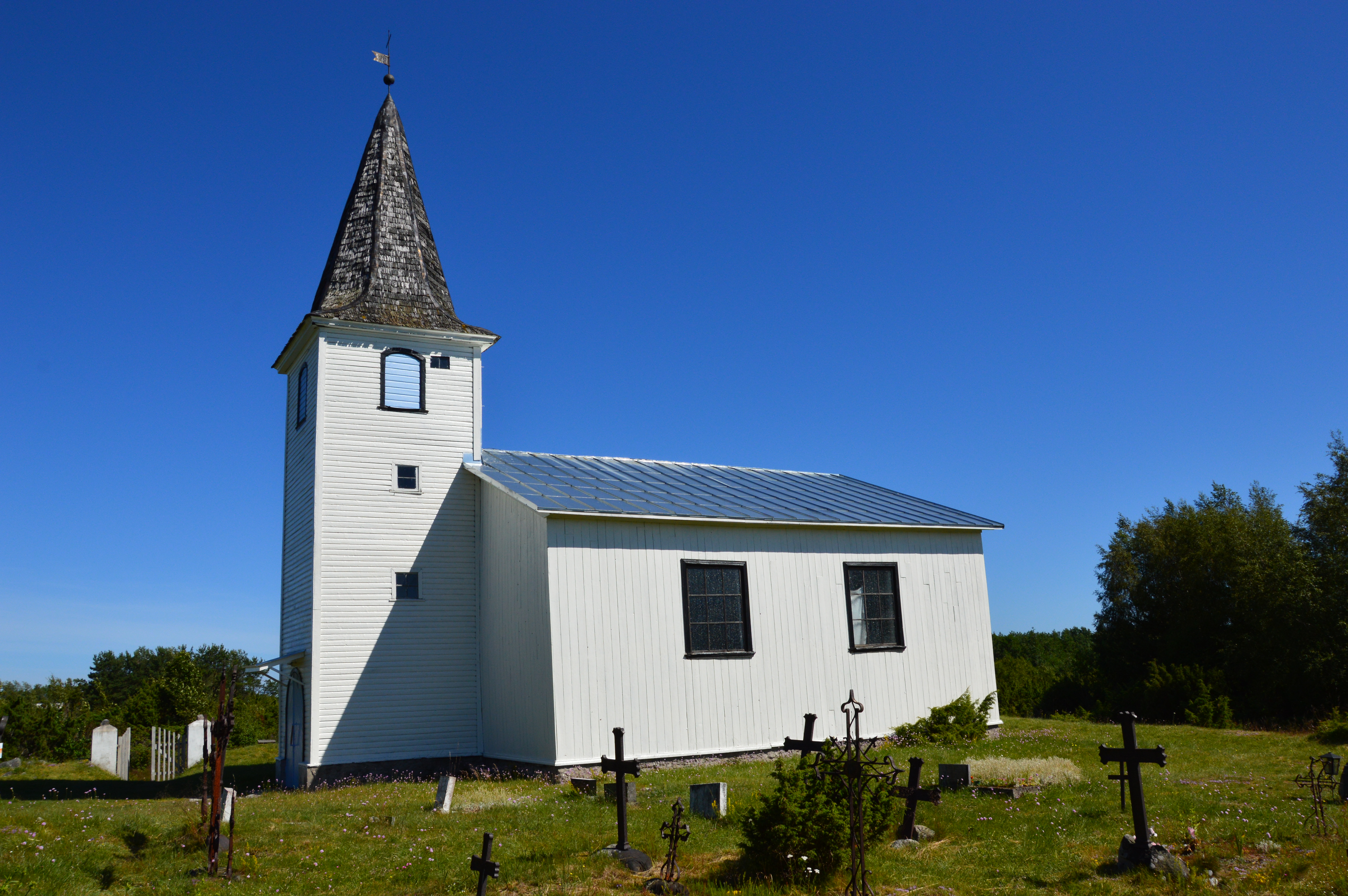
Church

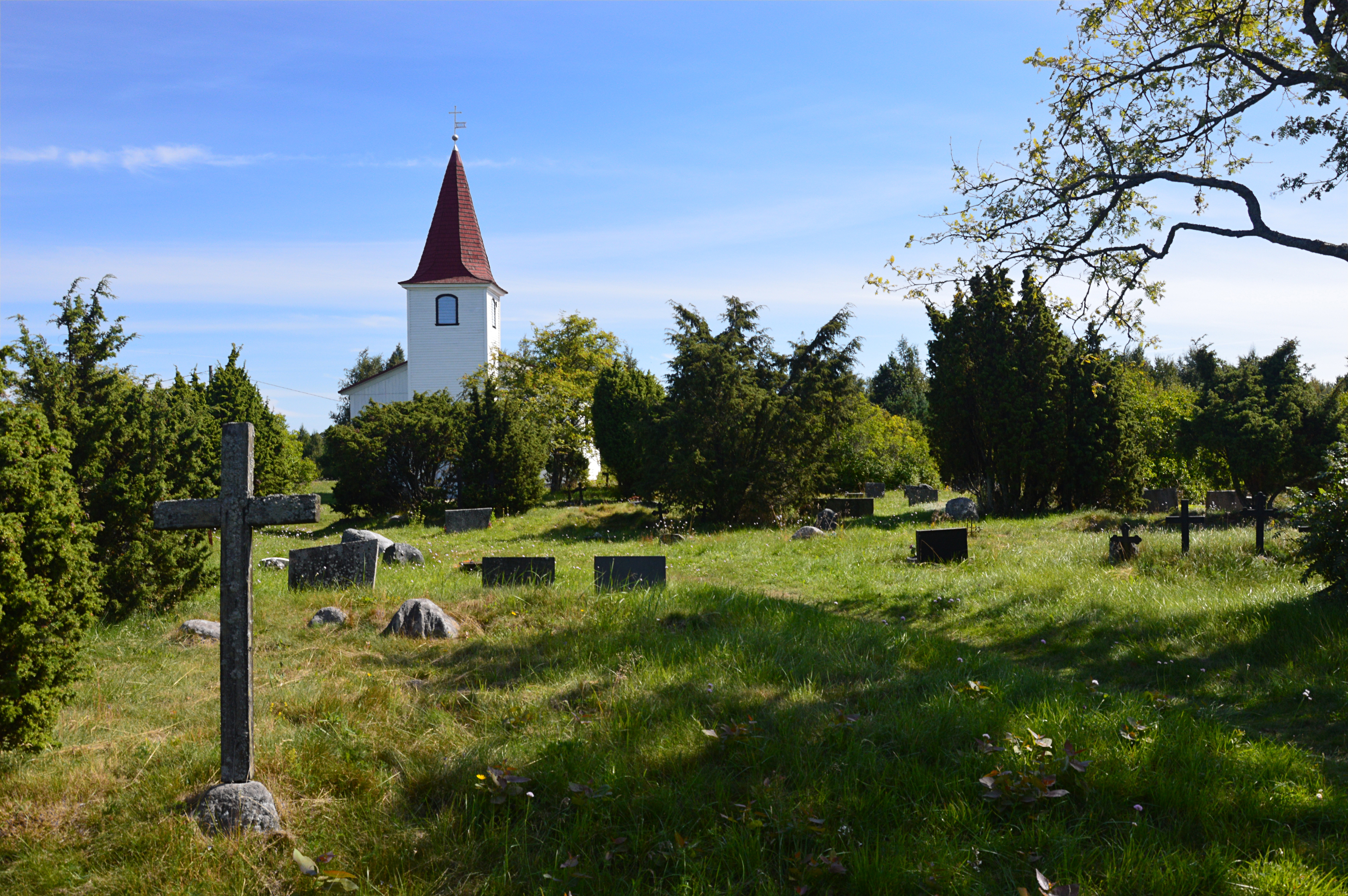
Churchyard
