= Aksi =

Island in Estonia

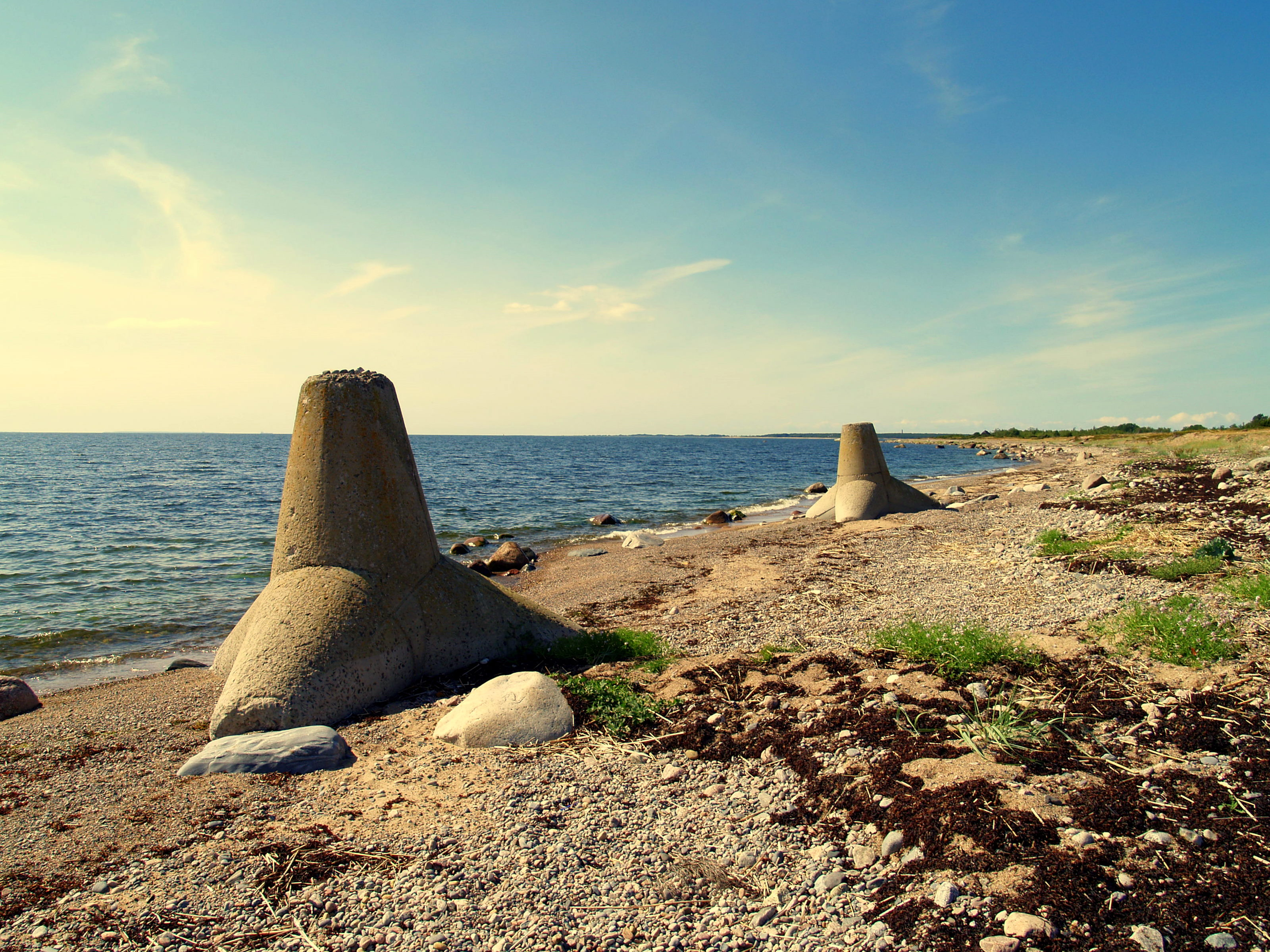
Beach of Aksi

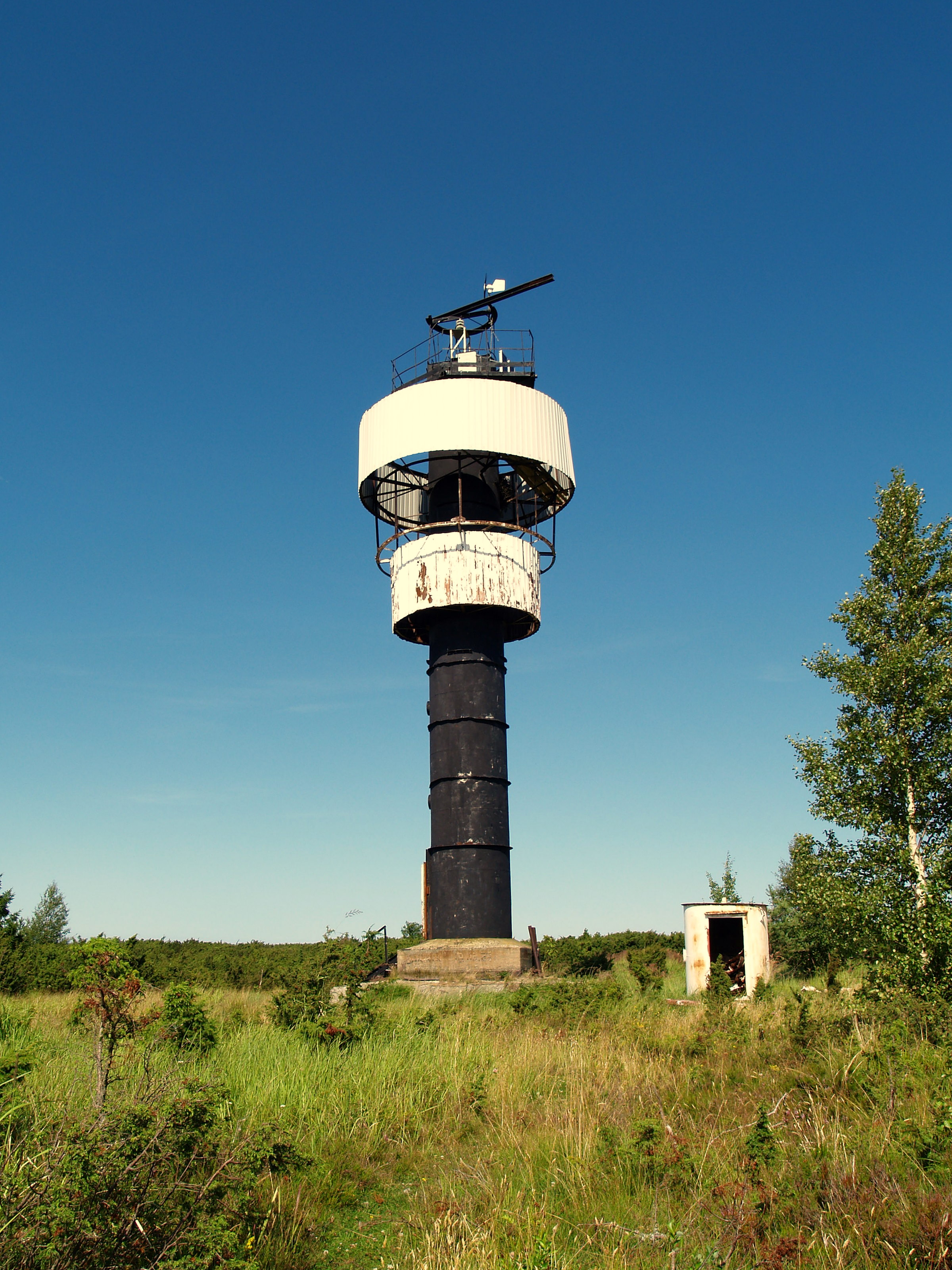
Aksi lighthouse

Aksi (also known as Väike-Prangli (Little Prangli) or Äksi) (Swedish: Lilla Wrangelsö) is an Estonian island in the Gulf of Finland with an area of 59 hectares. Coordinates are It forms an archipelago with nearby islands of Prangli and Keri. Aksi belongs to Idaotsa village in Viimsi Parish, Harju County.

Aksi is a part of the Prangli Landscape Conservation Area. The island's northern end is stony, its southern end is sandy and covered with junipers and birches.

Aksi was inhabited from 1790 to 1953, when the last inhabitants were forced to leave by the Soviet border guard. Many had fled already in 1944, mainly to Sweden.

The family that lived there was Aksberg. There is a lighthouse which was built in 1986.

== See also ==
- List of islands of Estonia
