= Idaotsa =

Village in Estonia

Coordinates: 59°37′N 25°01′E

- Village
- Interactive map of Idaotsa
- Country: Estonia
- County: Harju County
- Parish: Viimsi Parish
- Time zone: UTC+2 (EET)
  - Summer (DST): UTC+3 (EEST)

Idaotsa is a village in Viimsi Parish, Harju County in northern Estonia. Its one of the three villages located on the island of Prangli, the others being Kelnase and Lääneotsa

Administratively the island of Aksi, located about 2 km southeast, also belongs to Idaotsa village.
