= Keri (island) =

Island in the Gulf of Finland

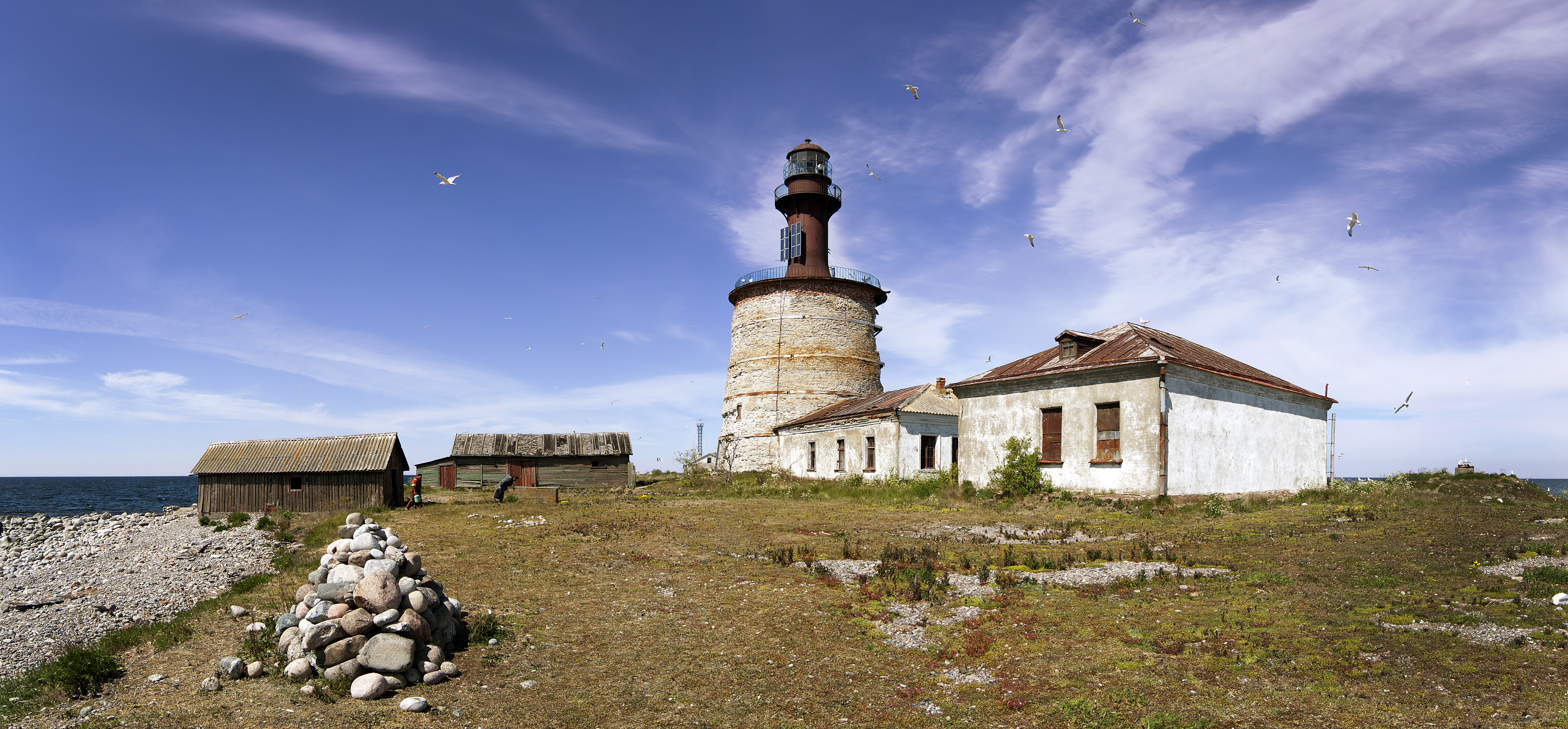
- Keri Lighthouse
- Interactive map of Keri

Geography
- Location: Gulf of Finland
- Coordinates: 59°42′N 25°02′E
- Area: 3.1 ha (7.7 acres)

Administration
- Estonia
- County: Harju County
- Municipality: Viimsi Parish
- Settlement: Kelnase village

Demographics
- Population: 0

Keri (Swedish: Kockskär) is a 3.1-hectare (7.7-acre) Estonian island in the Gulf of Finland. It is located about 6 km north of the island Prangli, and is one of the northernmost islands of Estonia. The uninhabited island is the site of notable Keri lighthouse.

Keri was first mentioned in 1623. Keri has long been situated by important sea routes. Therefore, in 1719 a lighthouse was erected there on the order of Peter the Great. The present lighthouse was built in 1803. During a well drilling in 1902 natural gas was discovered. From 1906 to 1912 the gas was used to power the lighthouse and heat the other buildings on the island. During that time it was the only lighthouse in the world to be powered by natural gas. In 1912 after a seismic impulse the gas flow stopped. The island has been inhabited only by the families of the lighthouse keepers. The last keeper left the island in September 2002. Since then the lighthouse operates automatically; the power is derived from a wind turbine and solar panels.

On June 14, 1940, the Finnish civilian airplane Kaleva was shot down by two Soviet Ilyushin DB-3 bombers near the island. On June 14, 1993, a monument to commemorate the 9 victims was erected on Keri.

There is an operational sauna on the island.

Administratively the island belongs to the Kelnase village in Viimsi Parish, Harju County.

== Gallery ==
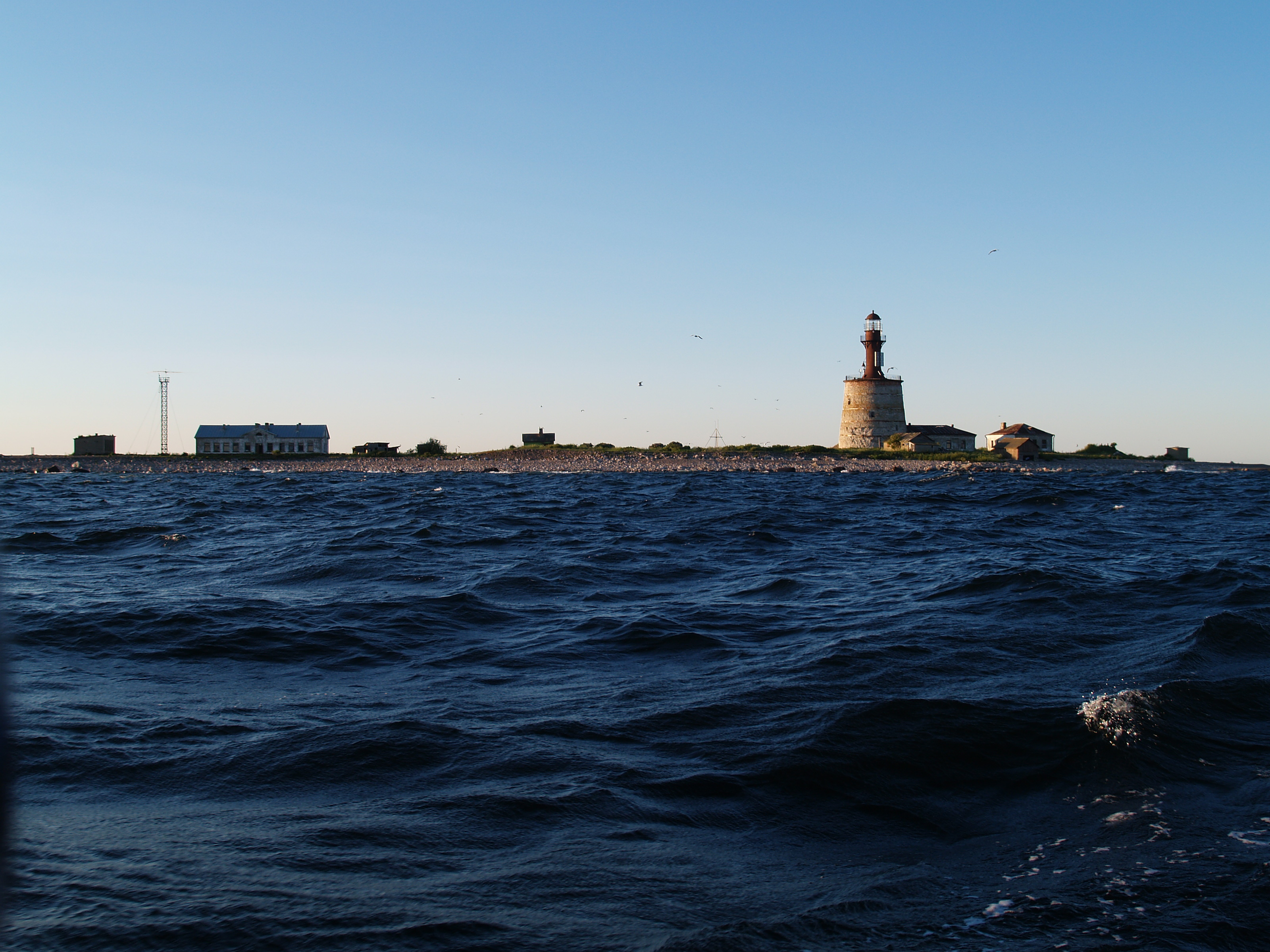

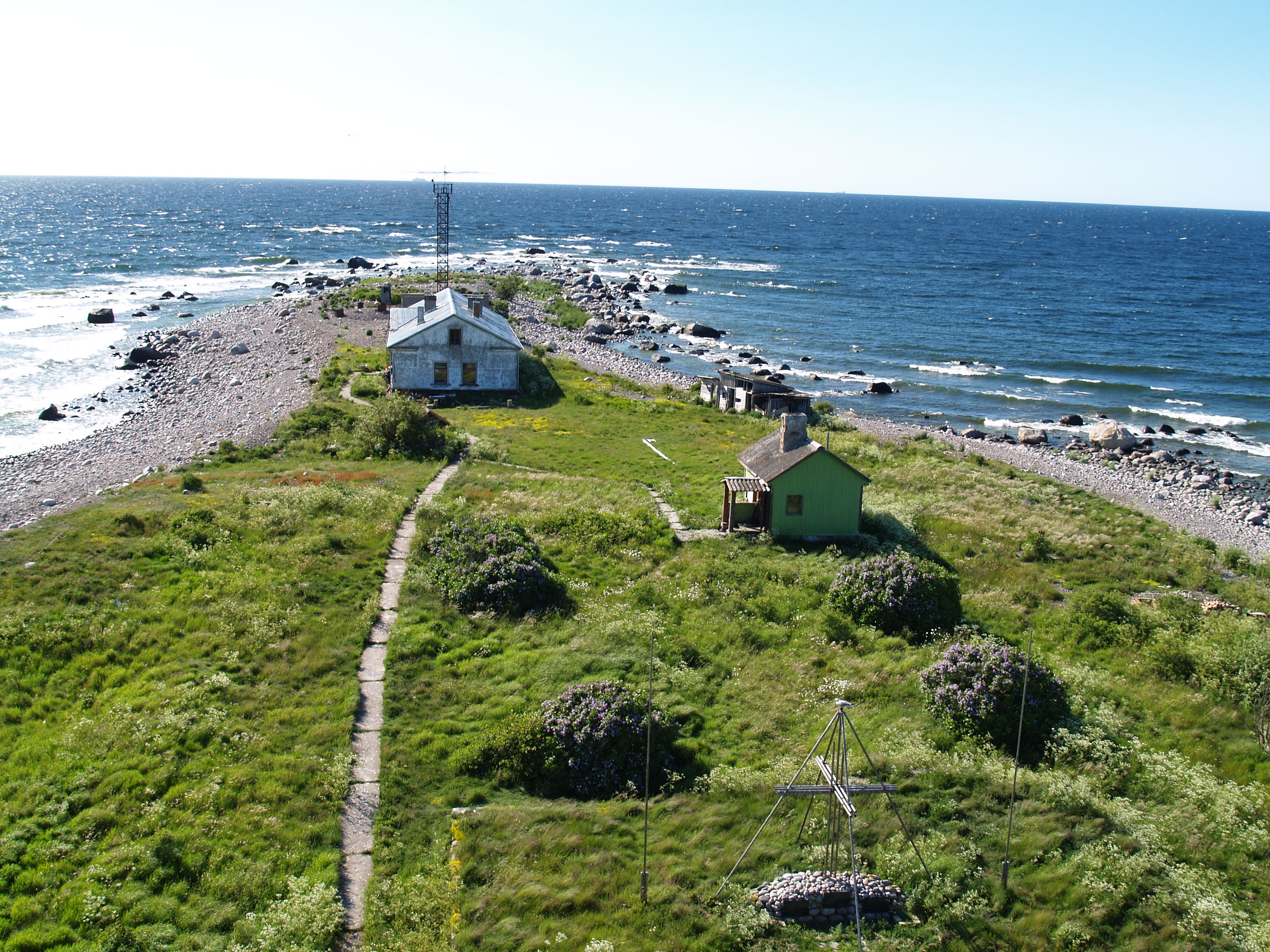

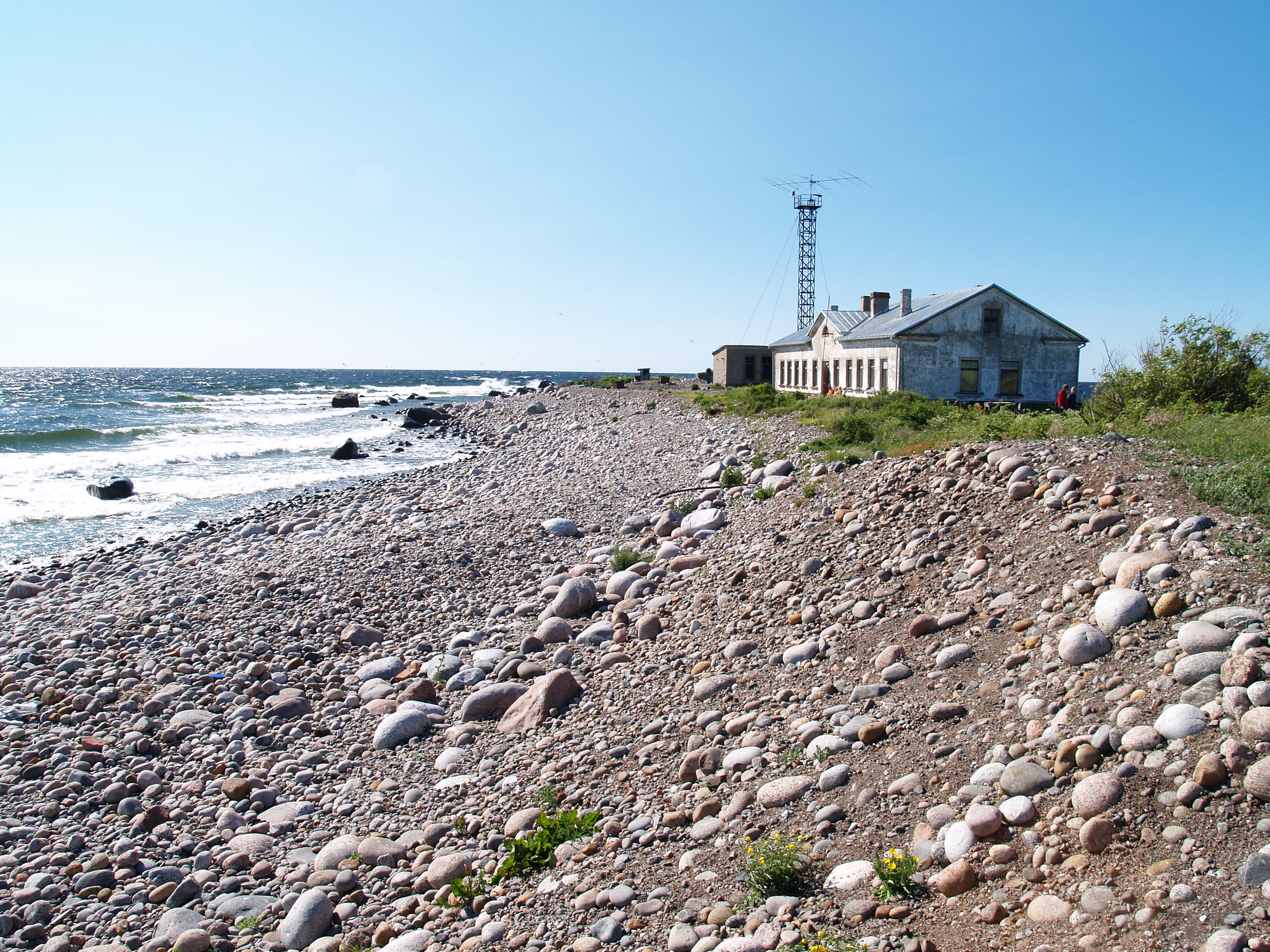

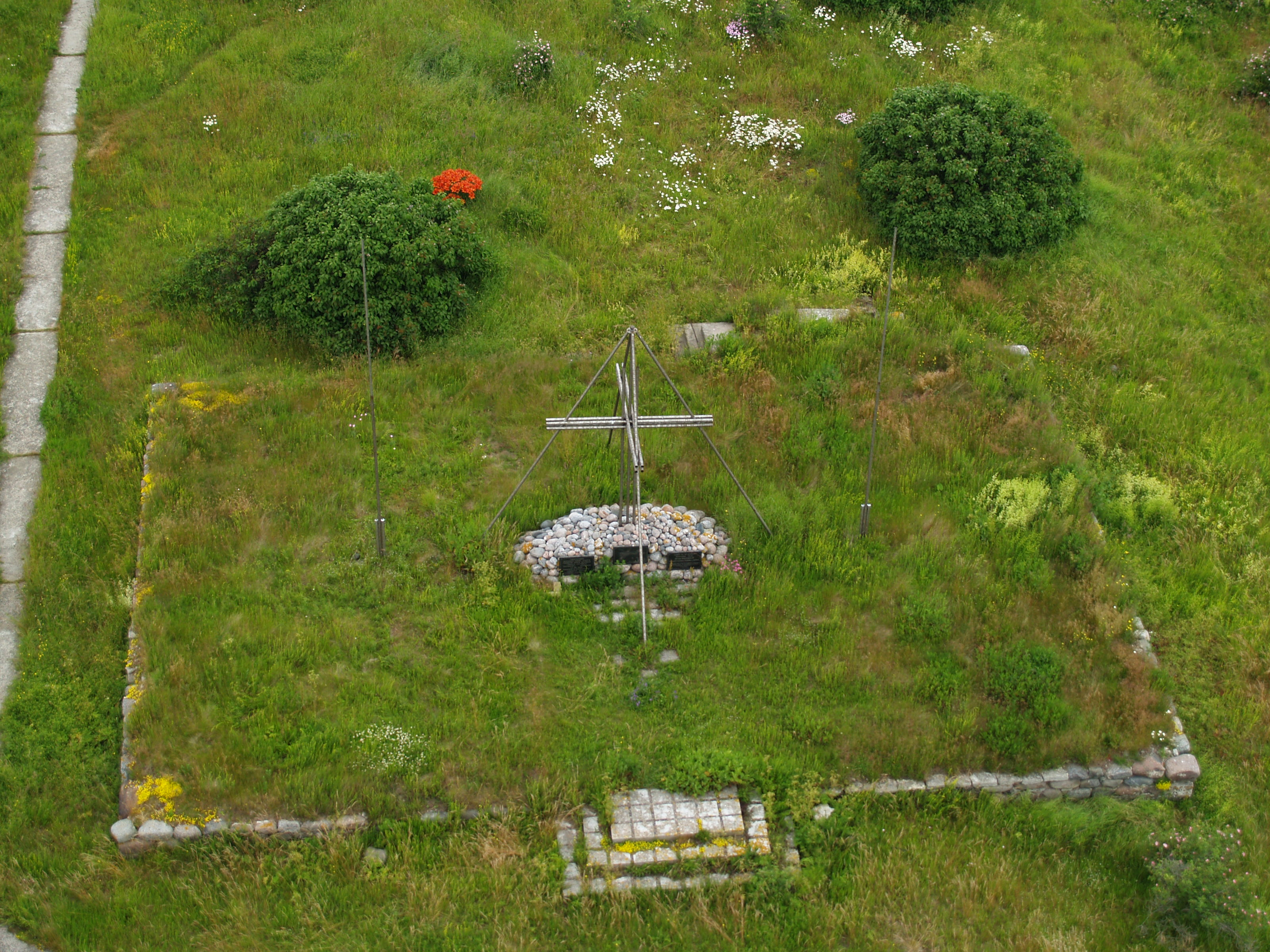
Kaleva memorial
