= Prangli Landscape Conservation Area =

Protected area in Estonia

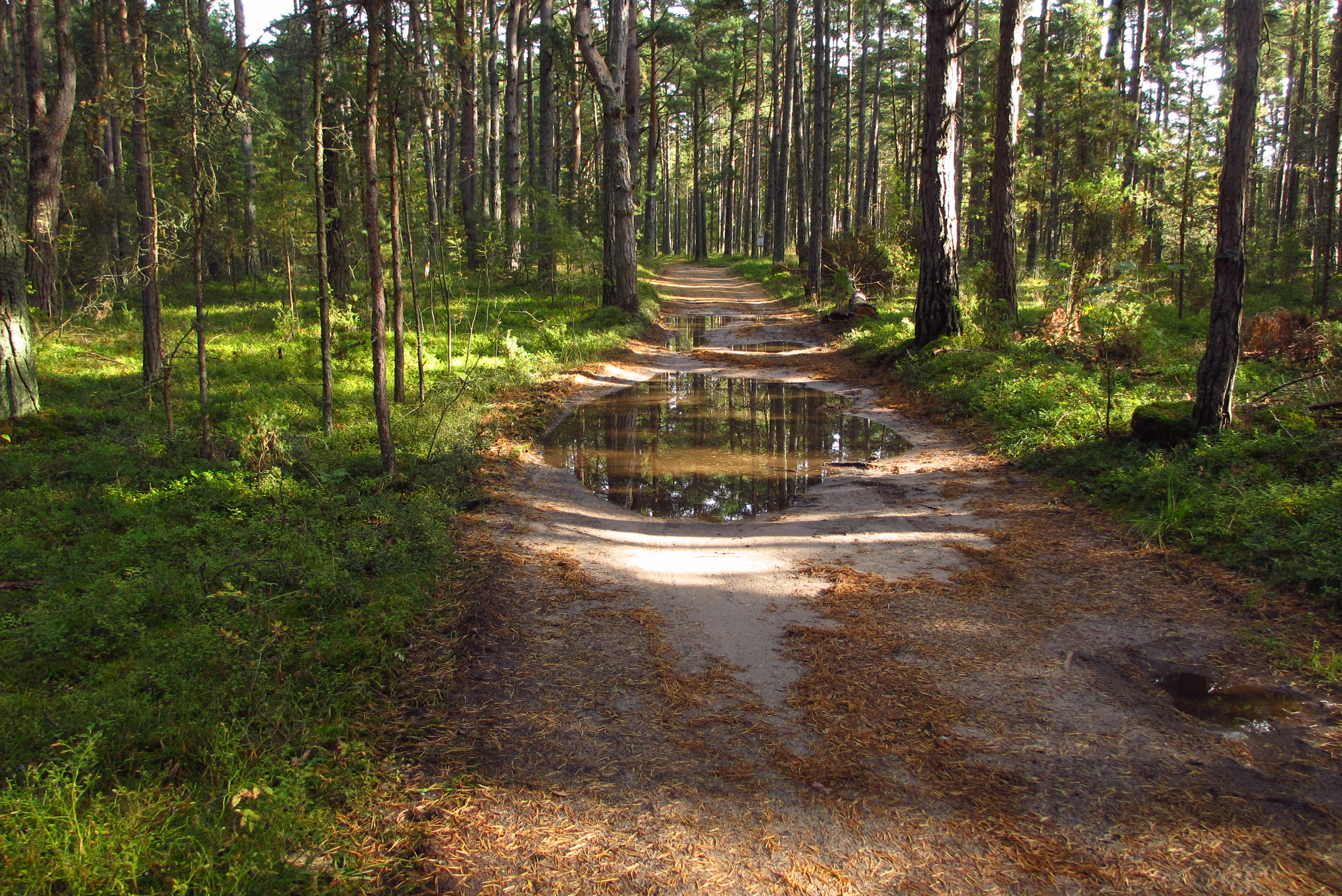

- Location within Estonia
- Location: Estonia
- Coordinates: 59°36′00″N 25°05′20″E
- Area: 135 ha (330 acres)
- Established: 1981 (1999)

Prangli Landscape Conservation Area (Estonian: Prangli maastikukaitseala) is a nature park which is located in Harju County, Estonia.

The area of the nature park is 135 ha.

The protected area was founded in 1981 to protect forest on Prangli island (Estonian: Prangli kaitsemets) and smaller nearby island Aksi. In 1999, the protected area was designated to the landscape conservation area.
