= Kaleva (airplane) =

Passenger airliner shot down by Soviet bombers in 1940

Aero Flight 1631
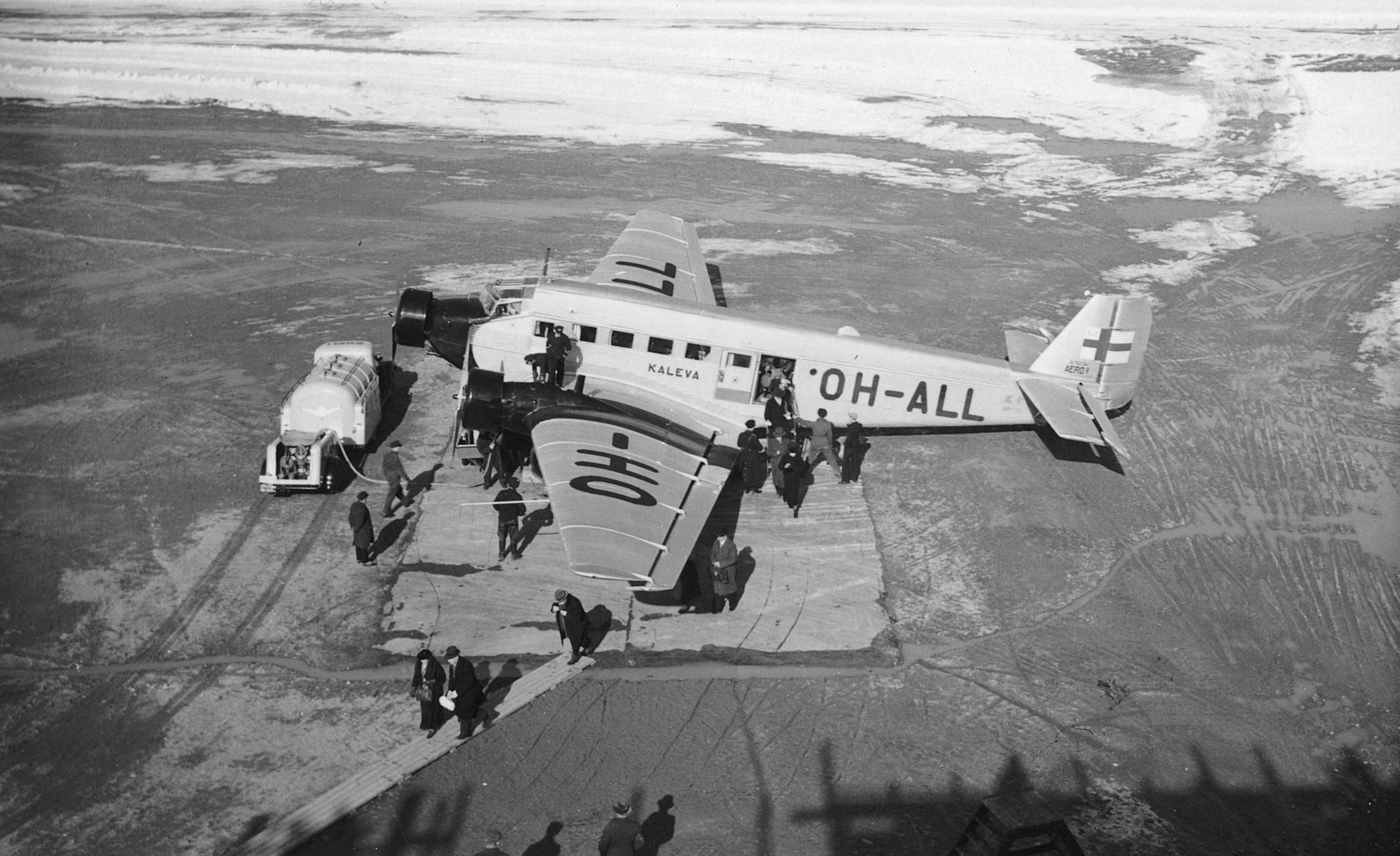
- OH-ALL, the aircraft involved, seen in 1938

Shootdown
- Date: 14 June 1940
- Summary: Airliner shootdown
- Site: Baltic Sea, near Keri island, Estonia; 59°47′1″N 25°01′6″E

Aircraft
- Aircraft type: Junkers Ju 52
- Aircraft name: Kaleva
- Operator: Aero O/Y
- Registration: OH-ALL
- Flight origin: Ülemiste Airport
- Destination: Helsinki-Malmi Airport
- Occupants: 9
- Passengers: 7
- Crew: 2
- Fatalities: 9
- Survivors: 0

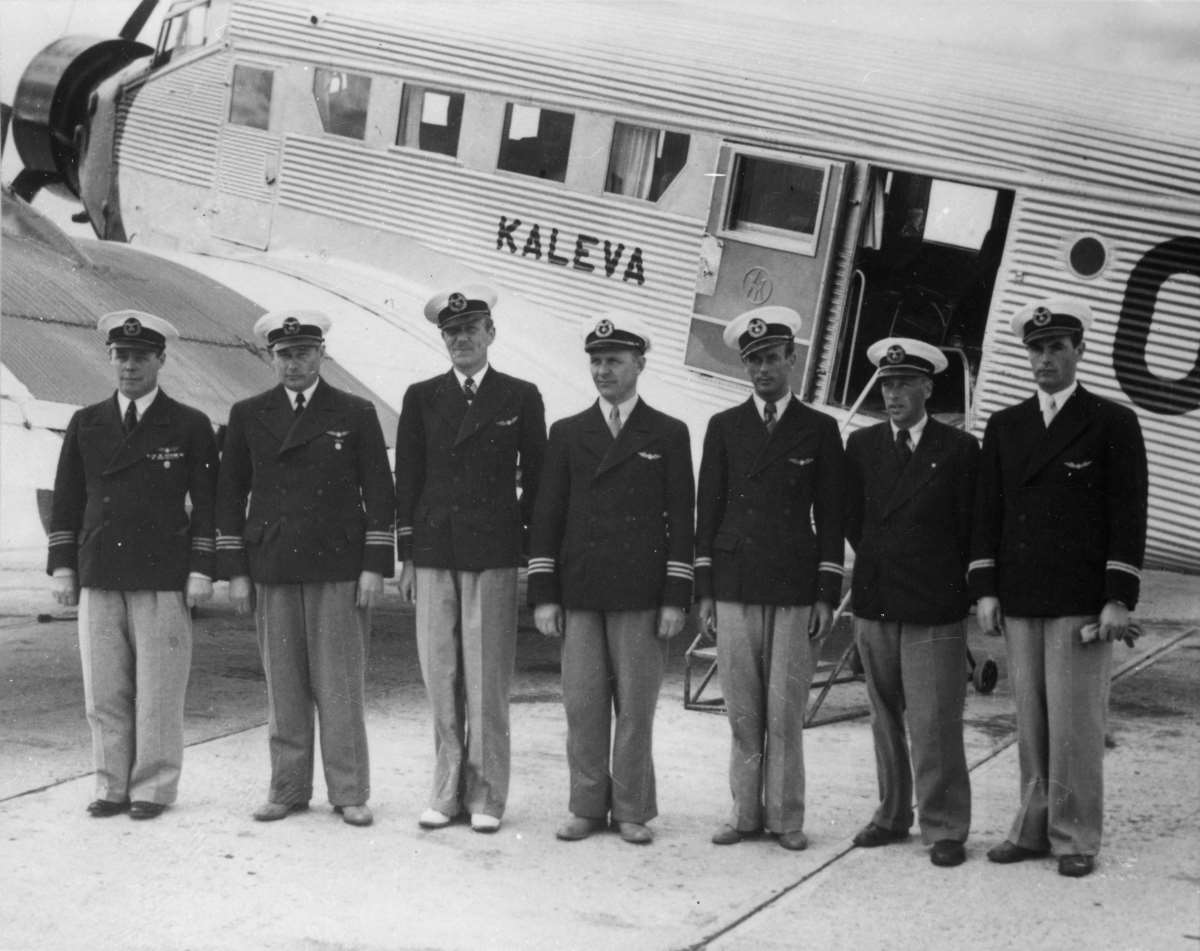
The Aero O/Y pilots by Kaleva in spring 1940 (third from left: Bo von Willebrand)

Kaleva was a civilian Junkers Ju 52 passenger airplane belonging to the Finnish carrier Aero O/Y. On June 14, 1940, as Flight 1631 from Tallinn in Estonia to Helsinki in Finland, it was shot down over the Gulf of Finland by two combat aircraft of Soviet Naval Aviation and downed near the Estonian island of Keri, killing all nine on board. The incident occurred during the Interim Peace between the Soviet Union and Finland, and at the outset of the Soviet occupation of Estonia.

The airplane's wreck was found on June 5, 2024, by Estonian unmanned underwater vehicles near the Keri lighthouse in Estonian territorial waters. The wreck is located at a depth of 71 to 76 metres (233 to 249 ft).

== Shootdown ==
On June 14, 1940, Kaleva had already made the scheduled stops along the route Stockholm-Turku-Helsinki-Tallinn and, as Aero Flight 1631 on its first return leg, was due to fly from Tallinn (Ülemiste) to Helsinki (Malmi) airport. A few minutes after taking off from Tallinn, the airliner was joined at close range by two Soviet Ilyushin DB-3 (DB-3T) torpedo bombers.

According to the memoirs of the future Lieutenant General Pyotr Khokhlov, on that day, two high-speed DB-3T bombers from the 1st Mine-Torpedo Aviation Regiment (1 MTAP) of the Air Force of the Red Banner Baltic Fleet patrolled the sky near the coast of Estonia, which saw a passenger plane heading towards Finland a few kilometers from Tallinn. The commander of the lead aircraft was Shio Bidzinashvili.

The Soviet aircraft opened fire with their machine guns and lethally damaged Kaleva, causing it to crash into water a few kilometers northeast of the Estonian Keri island in the Gulf of Finland. All nine passengers and crew members on board were killed, and the victims' bodies were never recovered.

Estonian fishermen had witnessed the attack and crash of the plane. Shortly after the crash a Soviet submarine Shch-301 (Щ-301) surfaced and inspected the fishing boats. The Soviet submariners confiscated items taken from the wreck by the fishermen, and were also able to pick up some items and diplomatic mail from the wreck and the sea. The future top-scoring Finnish pilot Ilmari Juutilainen was sent to inspect the crash site. After the Soviets spotted the Finnish airplane, the submarine hid its flag.

At the time of the incident Finland was not at war with the Soviet Union. The attack occurred amidst Soviet preparations for the full-scale invasion and occupation of Estonia by the USSR on 16–17 June 1940, just two days after the Kaleva incident. The Soviet invasion was preceded for several days by a Soviet air and naval blockade, which included preventing diplomatic mail from being sent abroad from Estonia. The passengers on the last flight of Kaleva included two German businessmen, two French embassy couriers, one Swede, an American courier, and an Estonian woman. The French couriers had over 120 kilograms (260 lb) of diplomatic mail in the plane. The American courier was reportedly transporting the U.S. military codes to safety from Estonia.

The government of Finland did not send any complaints or questions to the Soviets out of fear of hostile Soviet response, and the true reason for the crash was hidden from the public. This was due to the heavy pressure put upon Finland during the Interim Peace by the Soviets. After the outbreak of the Continuation War, the incident was described in detail by the government.

=== Later Soviet reports ===
The commander of Shch-301 G. Goldberg's report on the incident held in the Russian State Naval Archives starts with the notice of a Finnish airplane on its way from Tallinn to Helsinki on 14 June 1940 at 15.05 PM. According to the report, the airplane was chased by two Soviet Tupolev SB high-speed bombers. At 15.06 PM, the Finnish airplane caught fire and fell into the sea, 5.8 miles (9.3 km) from the submarine. At 15.09 PM the submarine set course to the crash site and made it to the location by 15.47 PM. The submarine was met by three Estonian fishing boats near the detritus of the airplane. The Estonian fishermen were searched by lieutenants Aladzhanov, Krainov and Shevtshenko. All valuables found from the fishermen and in the sea were brought on board the submarine: the items included about 100 kg (220 lb) of diplomatic post, valuables and foreign currencies. At 15.58 a Finnish fighter plane was noticed on course towards the submarine. The airplane made three circles above the site and then flew towards Helsinki. The exact coordinates of the crash site were determined to be at 59°47′1″N 25°01′6″E.

Captain A. Matveyev's report states that on board the Shch-301 noticed an airplane crash on 14 June 1940 at 15.06 on 5.8 miles (9.3 km) distance from the submarine. At the crash site three Estonian fishing boats and the remains of the airplane were found. At 15.58 PM a Finnish fighter plane made three circles above the crash site. By 16.10 PM all items found from the sea and from the hands of the fishermen were brought on board the submarine. The items included about 100 kg (220 lb) of diplomatic mail, and valuables and currencies including: 1) Two golden medals, 2) Finnish mark 2,000, 3) 10,000 Romanian leu, 4) 13,500 French franc, 5) 100 Yugoslav dinar, 6) Italian lira 90, 7) United States dollar 75, 8) 521 Soviet roubles, 9) 10 Estonian kroons. All items were put on board of patrol boat Sneg and sent to Kronstadt.

A well-known navigator of Soviet long-range aviation, Lt General Pyotr Khokhlov, in his memoirs "Above Three Seas" (1988) described his participation in the incident:

...after having approached the aircraft Ju-52 without any identification marks, I opened the astrohatch of my cabin, rose, and showed the pilot by hand to turn the vehicle toward the (Tallinn) aerodrome. But the Junkers was flowing on the previous trajectory, and increased the speed. We crossed his trajectory two times making signs: "Demanding return!" Unknown crew ignored our demands. "Warning fire", says the commander (Colonel Sh. Bedzinashvili). Several bursts with tracer ammunition in front of the Junkers' cockpit do not change anything. We are so close to the chased aircraft that we can see through the illuminators the passengers in its overfilled cabin, their self-complacent faces. They show us clenched fists, threaten with pistols. After this, the violator aircraft was shot down. ...In parts of fuselage that were raised from the bottom of the gulf not only were plenty of material valuables discovered but also many documents with state secrets... We understood why the crew of the Ju-52 refused to comply with the demand to return to the aerodrome: they would have had to account for the espionage...

== Victims ==
People on board by nationality
Nationality	Passengers	Crew
Finland		2
France	2	
Germany	2	
Estonia	1	
Sweden	1	
United States	1	
Total	7	2

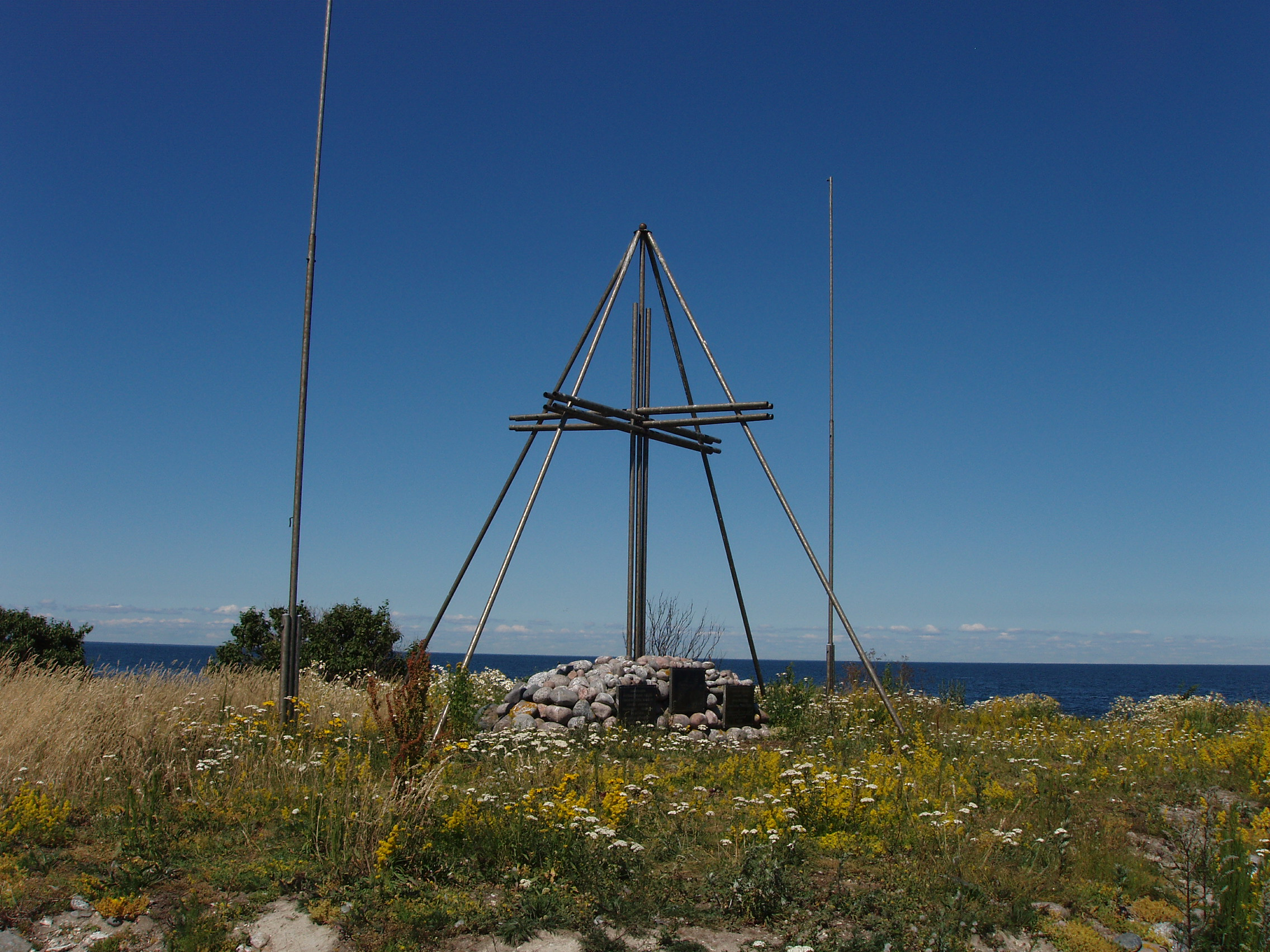
Memorial for the Kaleva victims on Keri island (2010)

The plane was piloted by Captain Bo von Willebrand, and Tauno Launis was the wireless operator. The American victim was Henry W. Antheil Jr., younger brother of noted composer George Antheil. Antheil worked as a clerk at the U.S. Legation in Helsinki. In 2007, he was honored for his service in a ceremony at the U.S. Department of State. His name was inscribed on the U.S. Department of State's Wall of Honor. The French victim was mathematician Frédéric Marty, who worked for the French embassy in Tallinn.

- Bo Hermansson von Willebrand (captain)
- Tauno Launis (co-pilot)
- Henry W. Antheil Jr. (American diplomat)
- Frédéric Marty (French diplomatic courier)
- Paul Longuet (French diplomatic courier)
- Rudolf Cöllen (Germany)
- Friedrich-Wilhelm Offermann (Germany)
- Max Hettinger (Sweden)
- Gunvor Maria Luts (Finnish-born Estonian citizen)

== 2024 wreck discovery ==
The Kaleva wreck was found on 5 June 2024, when Estonian diver Kaido Peremees' diving robots found the Kaleva wreck near the Keri lighthouse in Estonian territorial waters. The Kaleva wreck is located at a depth of 71 to 76 meters. Matias Laitinen, curator of the Finnish Aviation Museum, confirmed Peremees' discovery.

== See also ==
- List of airliner shootdown incidents
