= Polikarpov SPB (D) =

- A SPB (D) in a wind tunnel

General information
- Type: Dive bomber
- National origin: Soviet Union
- Manufacturer: Polikarpov
- Status: Cancelled
- Number built: 6

History
- First flight: 18 February 1940
- Developed from: Polikarpov VIT-2

The Polikarpov SPB (D) (Skorostnoy Pikiruyushchy Bombardirovshchik (Dalnost)—High Speed Dive Bomber (Distance)) was a Soviet twin-engined dive bomber designed before World War II. A single prototype and five pre-production aircraft were built, but two crashed and the program was cancelled in favor of the Petlyakov Pe-2.

== Development ==
The SPB (D) closely resembled the Polikarpov VIT-2, which had been recommended for production as a dive bomber, but the former actually was an entirely new design. It was smaller than the VIT-2 and had a monocoque fuselage. The main gears of the conventional undercarriage retracted aft into the rear of the engine nacelles and the tail wheel retracted into the rear fuselage. Two 783 kW (1,050 hp) liquid-cooled Klimov M-105 V12 engines were slung underneath the wings. It retained its predecessor's prominent canopy and nose glazing, but reduced the armament to a single 7.62 mm (0.300 in) ShKAS machine gun for the bombardier/navigator while the rear gunner had a retractable 12.7 mm (0.50 in) Berezin UB dorsal gun and a ventral ShKAS to protect the aircraft's underside. The bomb bay could carry up to 800 kg (1,764 lbs) internally and an additional 700 kg (1,543 lbs) of bombs could be carried underneath the wings.

In addition to the SPB (D) prototype, five pre-production machines were ordered even before the prototype made its first flight. This flight, piloted by Boris Kudrin, occurred safely on 18 February 1940, but on 27 April 1940 the first prototype crashed for unknown causes, killing test pilot Pavel Golovin.

On 2 June 1940 test pilot Mikhail Lipkin barely survived when, landing with engines out, his SPB (D) clipped a parked Tupolev SB. On 30 June the second SPB (D) disintegrated in flight. Lipkin and flight engineer Bulychov, instructed to test wing flutter at an extreme 600-km/h (373-mph) diving speed, were killed in the crash; the aircraft actually disintegrated in horizontal flight. Investigators initially blamed the accident on Polikarpov's deputy Zhemchuzhin, who allegedly failed to fit the balance weights into the leading edges of the ailerons, causing wild flutter. Later they also blamed Lipkin, already dead, for the alleged reckless increase of speed. TsAGI engineers and airfield staff voiced suspicion that other factors could have been involved, but these were not examined at all.

The third prototype, piloted by Kudrin, lost horizontal trim tab in flight; the pilot managed to land the plane but refused to fly on SPB (D) prototypes anymore. On 29 July 1940 the project was cancelled; tests required for proper crash examination were not completed. The government preferred to build twin-engined dive bombers on a simplified Petlyakov VI-100 platform, – the conversion, named Petlyakov Pe-2, took over the roles originally intended for the SPB (D).

== Specifications ==
Data from Gunston, The Osprey Encyclopaedia of Russian Aircraft 1875–1995

General characteristics

- Crew: 5
- Length: 11.2 m (36 ft 9 in)
- Wingspan: 17 m (55 ft 9 in)
- Wing area: 42.93 m^{2} (462.1 sq ft)
- Empty weight: 4,480 kg (9,877 lb)
- Gross weight: 6,850 kg (15,102 lb)
- Powerplant: 2 × Klimov M-105 V-12 inline engines, 783 kW (1,050 hp) each
- Propellers: 3-bladed

Performance

- Maximum speed: 520 km/h (320 mph, 280 kn) at 4,500 metres (14,764 ft)
- Range: 2,200 km (1,400 mi, 1,200 nmi)
- Service ceiling: 9,000 m (30,000 ft)

Armament

- Guns:
- 1x 12.7 mm Berezin UB machine gun
- 2x 7.62 mm ShKAS machine guns
- Bombs: up to 1,500 kilograms (3,307 lb) (800 internal, 700 external)

Aircraft of comparable role, configuration, and era

- Petlyakov Pe-2
