= Henry W. Antheil Jr. =

American diplomat

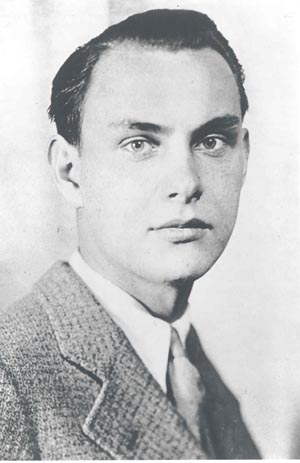
Henry W. Antheil Jr.

Henry William Antheil Jr. (September 23, 1912 – June 14, 1940) was an American diplomat killed in the shootdown of the Aero Flight 1631 by Soviet aircraft in the wake of the Soviet occupation of the Baltic States. He is considered one of the first American casualties of World War II.

== Biography ==
Antheil was born in Trenton, New Jersey and attended Trenton Central High School and Rutgers University.

Antheil, younger brother of noted composer George Antheil, was a clerk at the U.S. legation in Helsinki. He was killed on June 14, 1940, while serving as a diplomatic courier when the Finnish passenger plane Aero Flight 1631 was shot down over the Gulf of Finland near Tallinn, Estonia, at 14:05, approximately ten minutes after taking off from Tallinn Airport.

Two Soviet bombers downed the passenger airplane on the day the Soviet blockade of Estonia went into effect. According to an Associated Press wire story that ran the following day, Antheil was serving as a diplomatic courier when his plane exploded en route to Helsinki. The aircraft wreck was searched for repeatedly over many decades, but it was not until 2024 that the Estonian diving company Tuukritoode OU succeeded in finding the aircraft off the Estonian coast.

Antheil was carrying several diplomatic pouches from the U.S. legations in Tallinn and Riga. Soviet troops had already been based in Estonia since October 18, 1939, as a result of the Soviet–Estonian Mutual Assistance Treaty. Some Estonian researchers believe that Antheil's diplomatic pouches included secret information detailing the Soviet Union's future plans for the Baltic region that the Estonian General Staff had turned over to an unidentified U.S. government official earlier that same day. Back in the United States, the news of the Soviet blockade and the loss of the Aero Flight 1631 were overshadowed by a much bigger story that broke on the other side of Europe on June 14: the German occupation of Paris.

Antheil was honored at the American Foreign Service Association's Memorial Plaque Ceremony at the U.S. State Department's Diplomatic Lobby. The event, part of the annual Foreign Affairs Day celebration, honors those U.S. Embassy employees who have lost their lives while serving their country overseas in the line of duty. Members of Antheil's family were present.

== In arts and culture ==
Antheil's grandnephew G. Neal McTighe, past poet laureate of Carrboro, North Carolina, dedicated a poem titled "Kaleva" to Antheil and his fiancée, Greta Lindberg, in 2008.

Henry Antheil is a prominent character in the historical novel The Whores (in three volumes, 2015–2017) by Mart Sander, and subsequently in the TV drama series of that name (2018). The book follows the theory proposing that Henry Antheil (played in the series by Matt Fien) was tasked with transporting the last remaining gold from the Estonian gold depository (11 bars) to Finland, only days before the Soviet occupation begun. There was 227 kilograms of diplomatic luggage on the plane. This theory was first presented by Carl-Fredrik Geust, the son of Captain Bo von Willebrand, the pilot of Aero Flight 1631. Another theory suggests that the orders came straight from Stalin, who was convinced that Estonian president Konstantin Päts was trying to flee on the Aero Flight 1631 .
