= Keri Lighthouse =

Lighthouse in Estonia

Keri Lighthouse Keri tuletorn
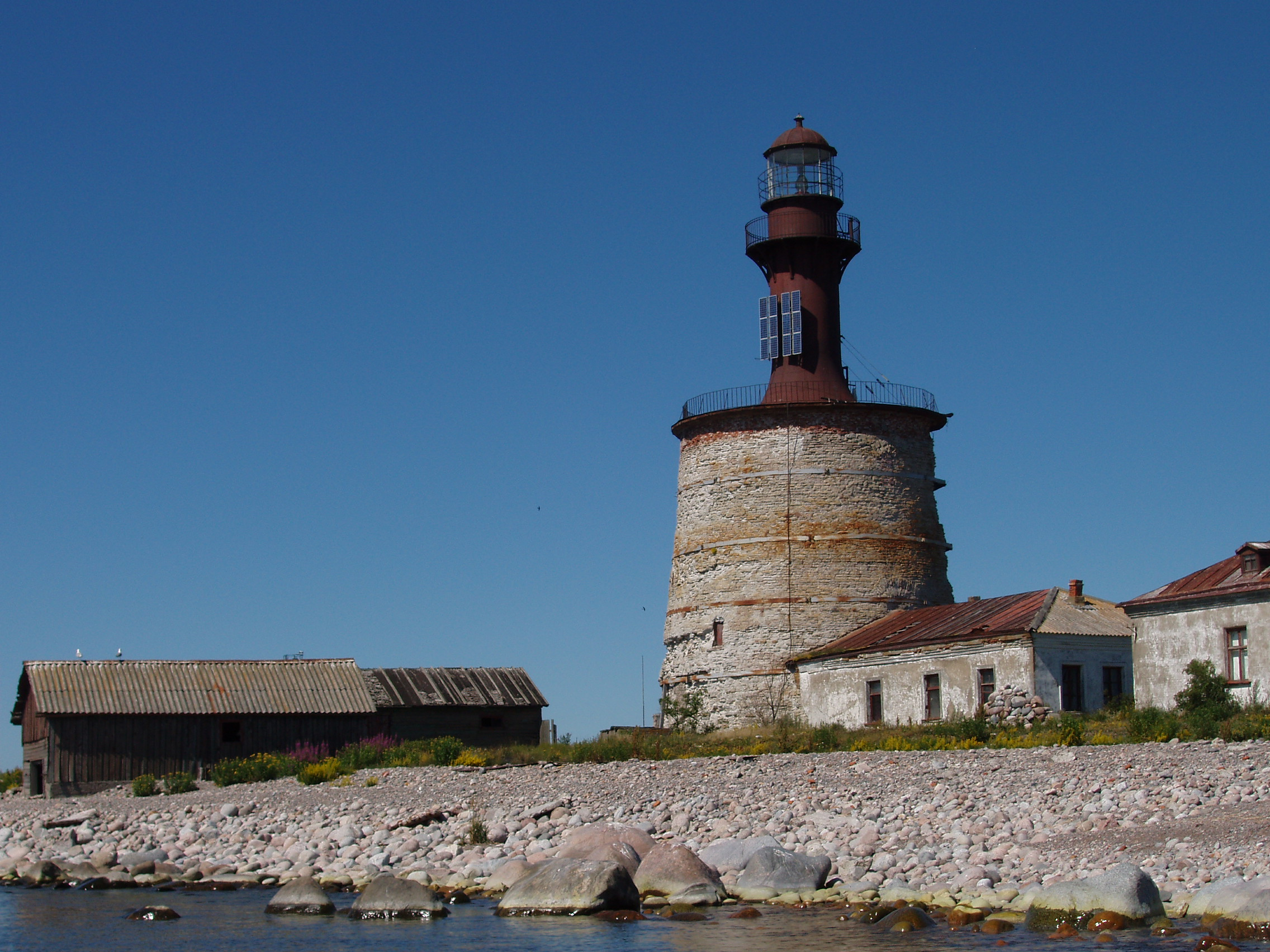
- Location: Keri Island; Estonia
- Coordinates: 59°41′55.38″N 25°1′21.78″E

Tower
- Constructed: 1724 (first); 1803 (second)
- Construction: cast iron tower on 15 metres (49 ft) high stone cylinder basement
- Automated: yes
- Height: 31 metres (102 ft)
- Shape: two-stage cylindrical tower with balcony and lantern
- Markings: unpainted stone lower tower and red upper tower
- Power source: solar power
- Heritage: architectural monument

Light
- First lit: 1858 (current)
- Focal height: 31 metres (102 ft)
- Range: 11 nautical miles (20 km)
- Characteristic: LFl W 15s
- Estonia no.: EVA 155

Keri lighthouse (Estonian: Keri tuletorn) is a lighthouse in Estonia, located on the Keri (Kockskär) island in the Gulf of Finland of the Baltic Sea. The light is at an elevation of 31 metres (102 ft) above sea level, while the lighthouse is 28 metres (92 ft) tall.

== History ==
The present-day lighthouse was built in 1858. It is a red metal cylinder topped with the lantern room and balcony which rests upon a cylindrical stone base. This light is computer controlled, powered by solar cells and batteries.

The original wooden lighthouse was built in 1724. It was rebuilt in the early 19th century with a stone base topped with a wooden tower.

From 1907 to 1912 it was the only lighthouse in the world to be powered by natural gas. In 1990 the stone base began to collapse and steel reinforcements were installed. In 2007 an internet camera was installed followed by an internet weather station in 2009.

== Specifications ==
During hours of darkness the light cycles with the following sequence: 13 seconds off; 2 seconds on. The light can be seen from 11 nautical miles.

== Postage stamp ==
The Estonian Post Office issued a stamp commemorating the Keri Lighthouse on 15 January 2003. First day cancel covers were also issued on that day.

== Gallery ==
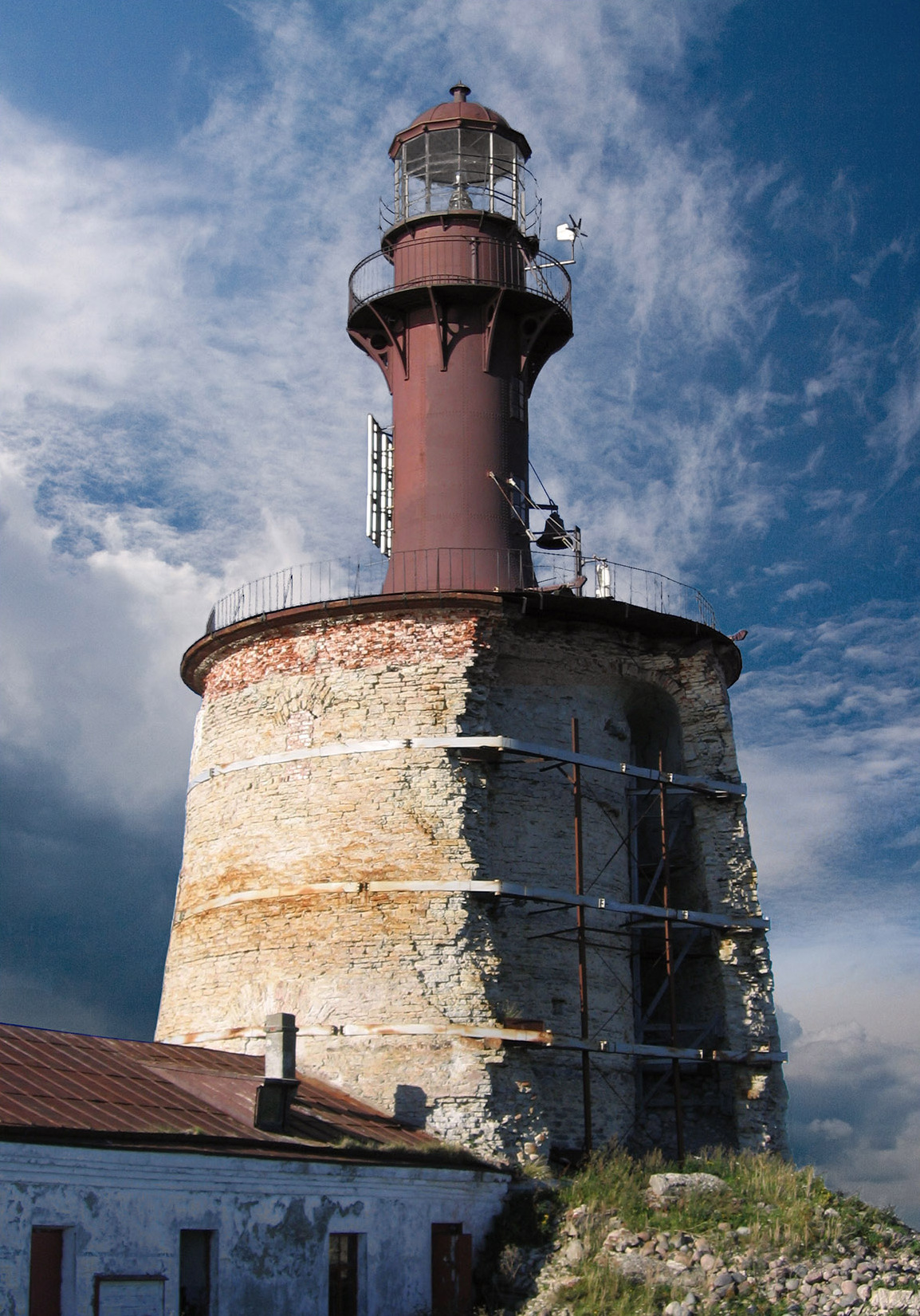
Keri Lighthouse in 2005

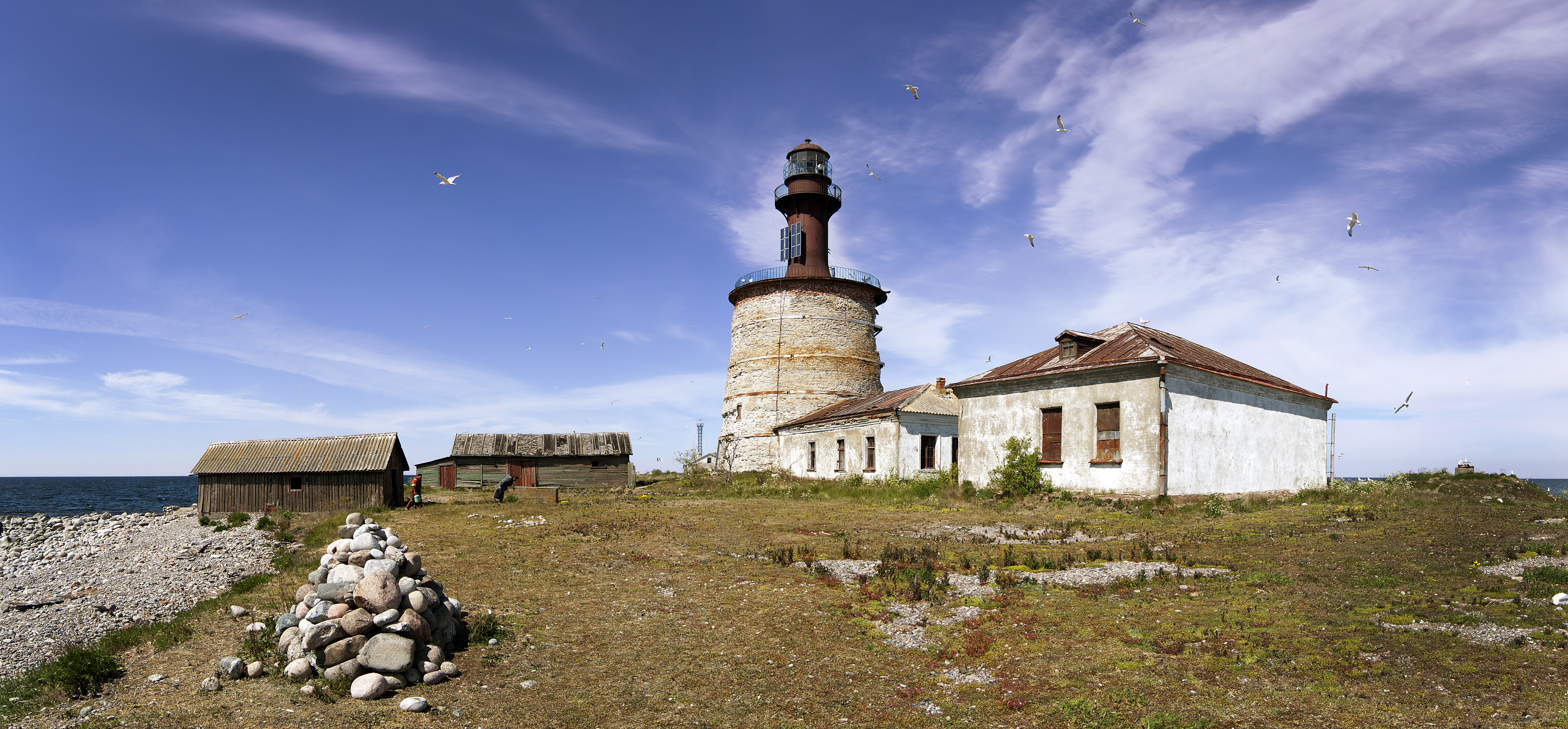
Keri Lighthouse and surrounding buildings, 2008

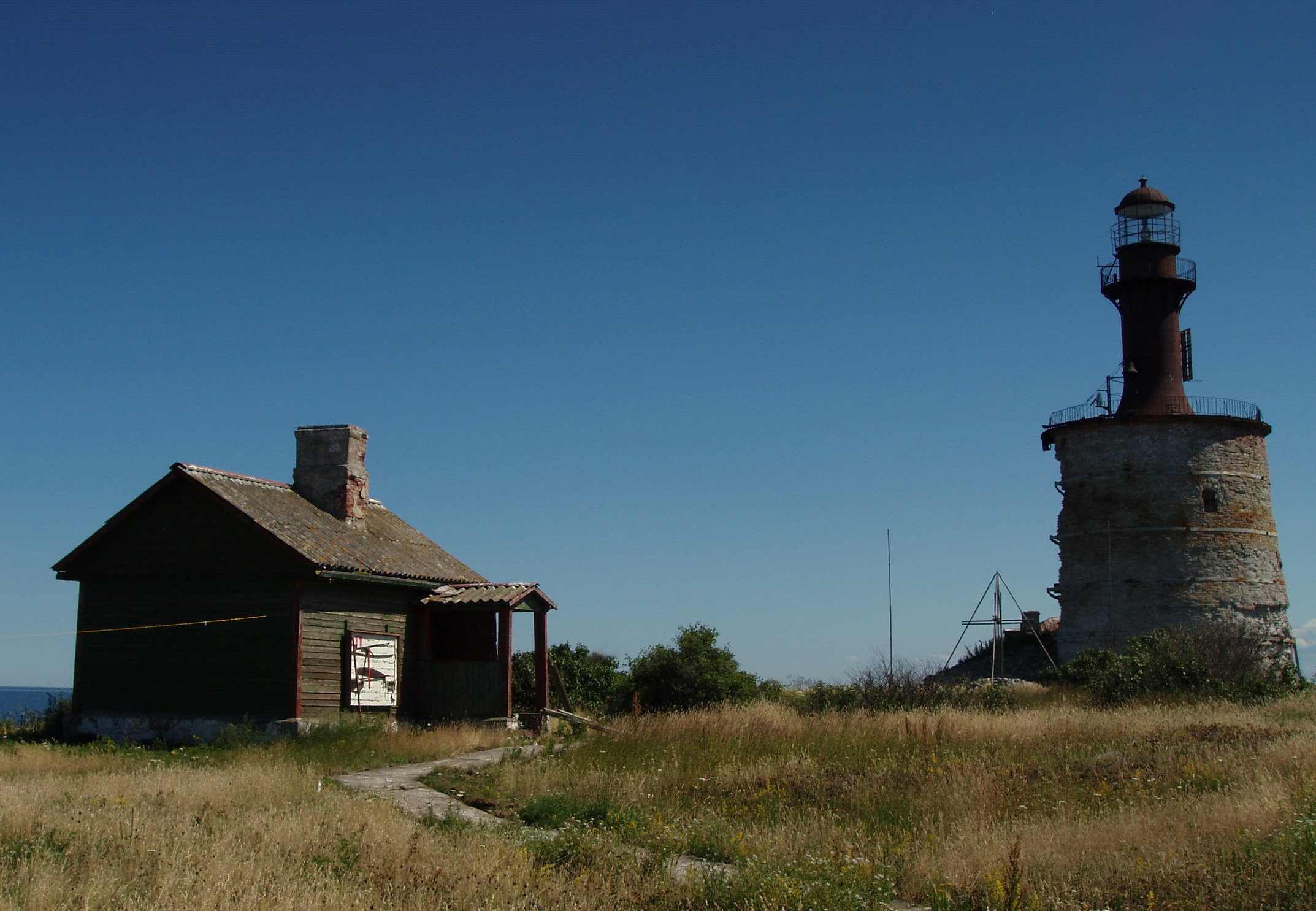
Sauna, memorial monument to the Kaleva, and the lighthouse

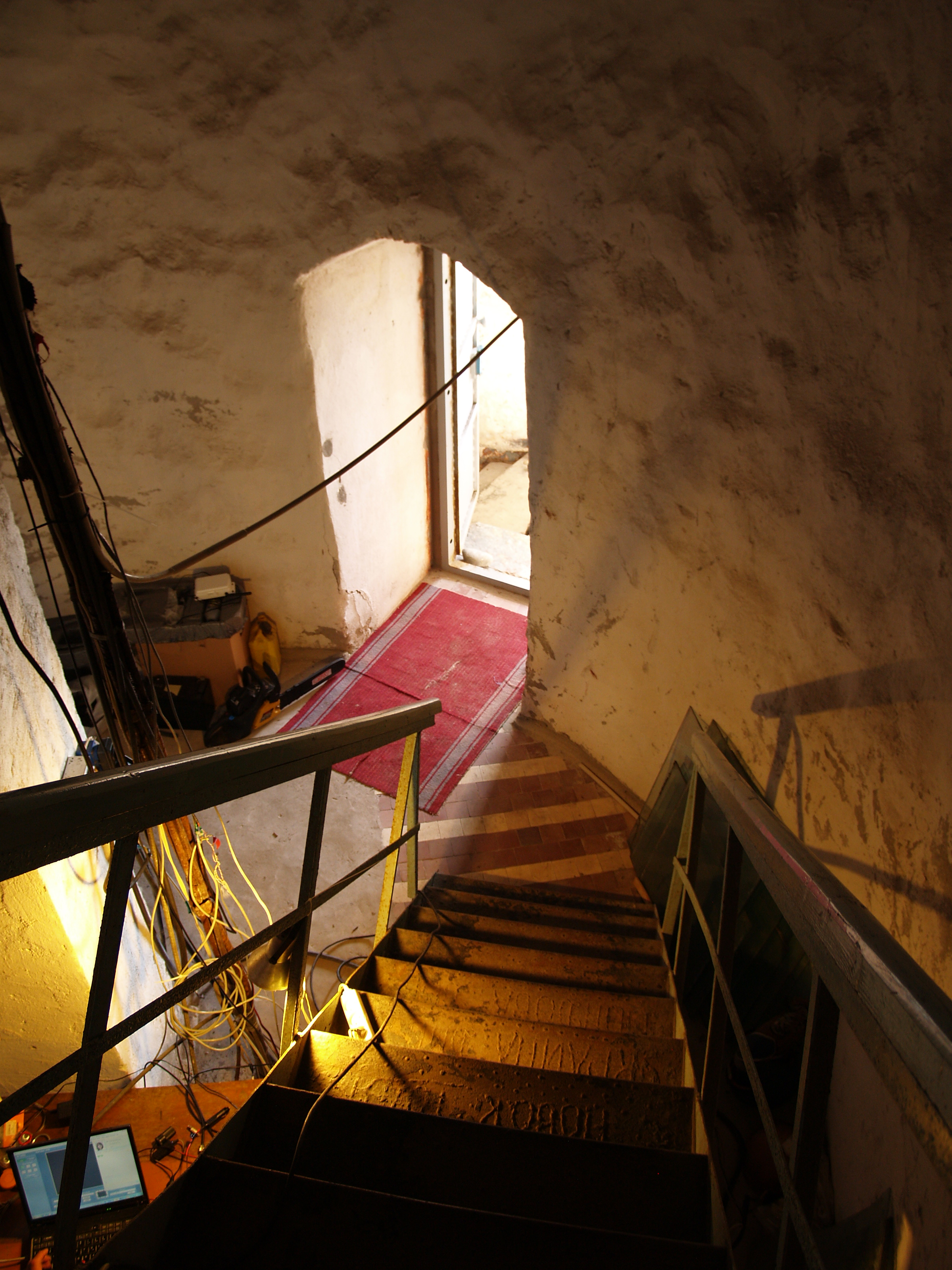
Interior

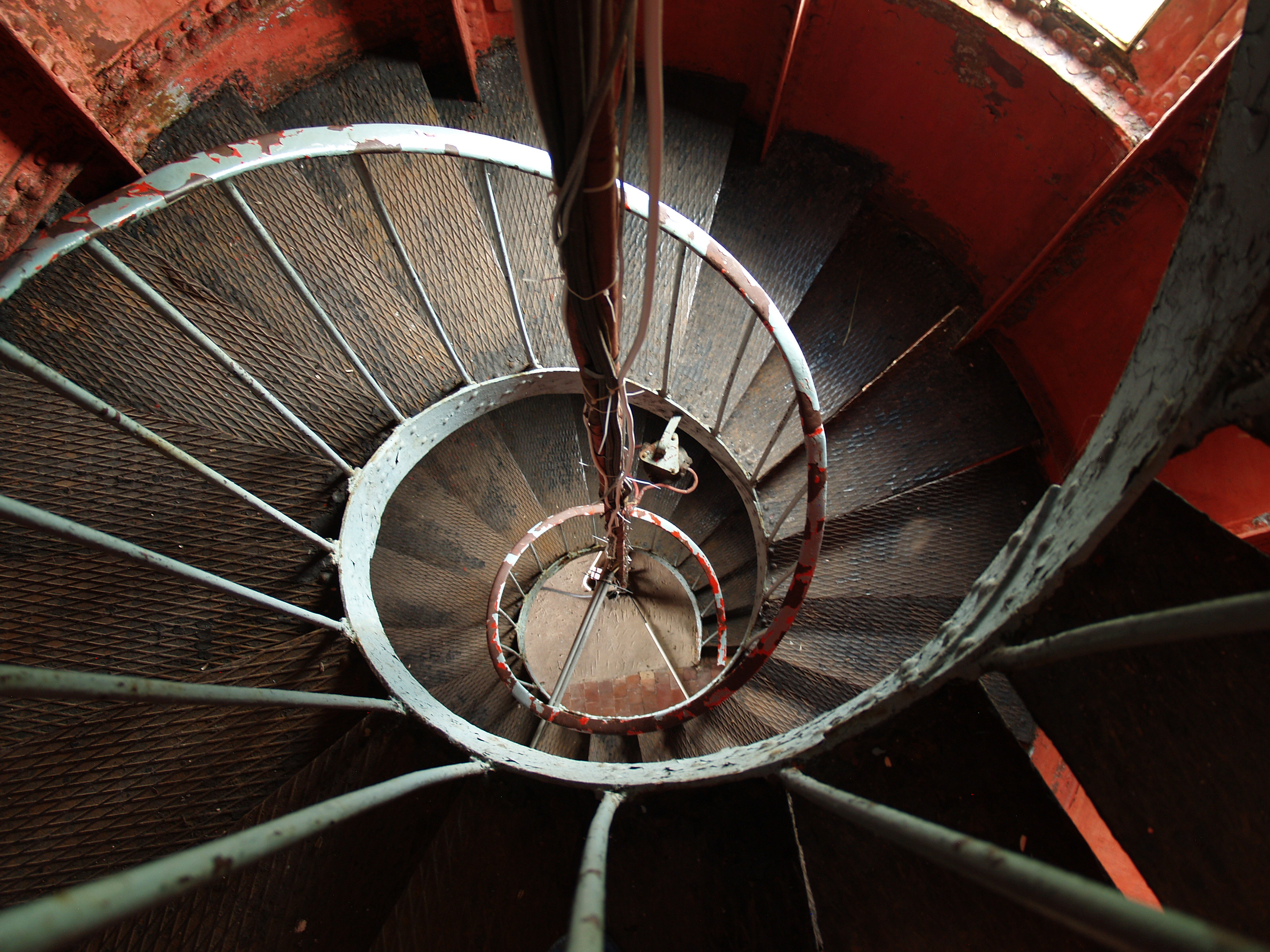
Stair

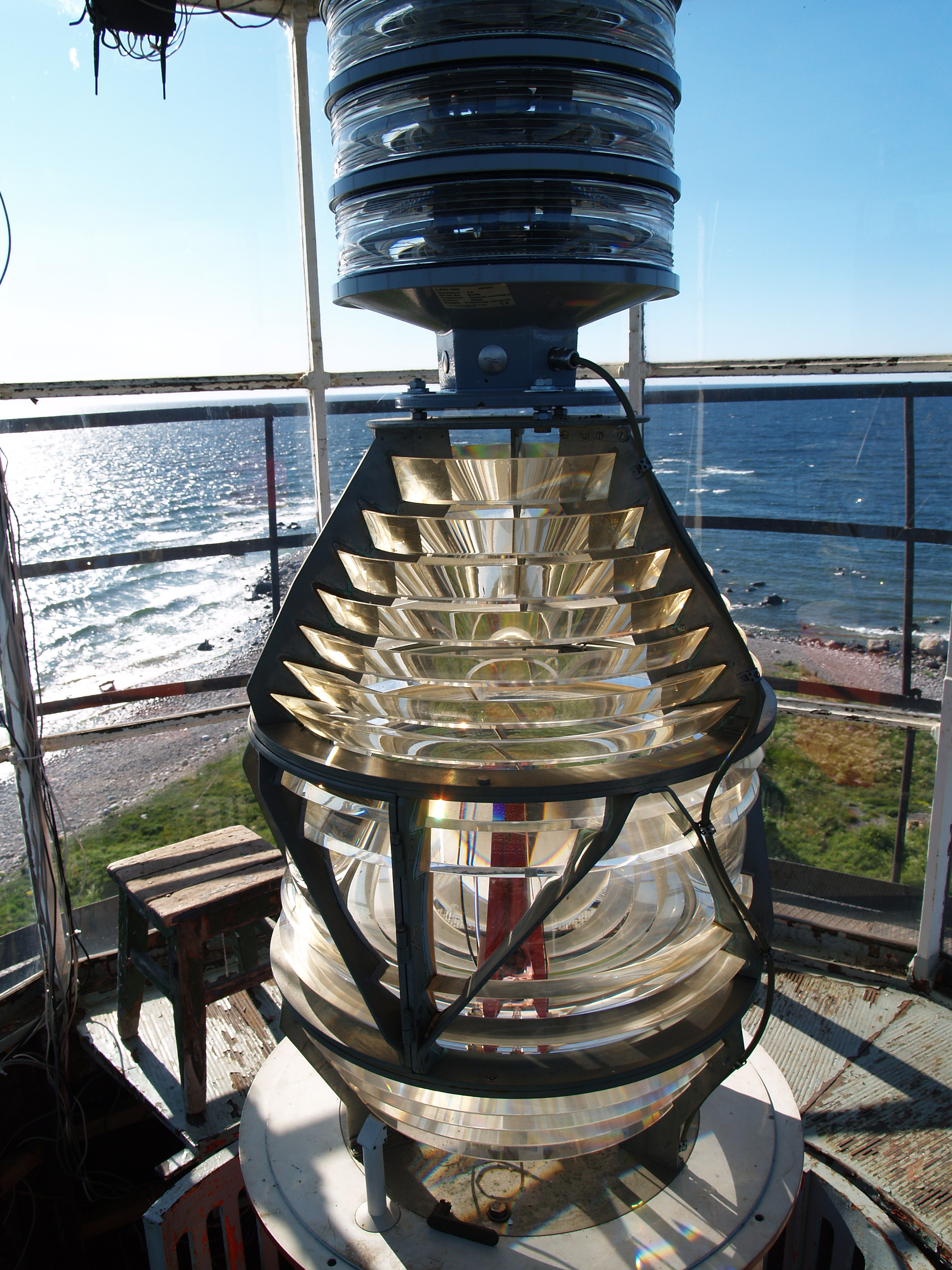
Light

== See also ==
- List of lighthouses in Estonia
