= July 1941 =

Month of 1941

<<	July 1941					>>
Su	Mo	Tu	We	Th	Fr	Sa
		1	2	3	4	5
6	7	8	9	10	11	12
13	14	15	16	17	18	19
20	21	22	23	24	25	26
27	28	29	30	31

The following events occurred in July 1941:

== July 1, 1941 (Tuesday) ==
- The Battle of Palmyra was fought in Syria, resulting in Allied victory.
- German and Finnish forces launched Operation Arctic Fox, aimed at capturing Salla.
- German forces captured Riga.
- German cruiser Prinz Eugen was bombed in Brest harbour by the Royal Air Force and severely damaged.
- The Vichy government froze Soviet assets in France.
- The Massacre of Lviv professors began.
- Joe DiMaggio of the New York Yankees tied the 44-year old hitting streak record of Wee Willie Keeler by hitting safely in both games of a doubleheader against the Boston Red Sox, extending the streak to 44 consecutive games.
- Full U.S. commercial television service began from the NBC station WNBT in New York City. The first official paid television advertisement was for Bulova watches and cost the advertiser $9.
- German submarine U-131 was commissioned.
- Born: Alfred G. Gilman, pharmacologist, biochemist and Nobel laureate, in New Haven, Connecticut (d. 2015); Rod Gilbert, ice hockey player, in Montreal, Quebec, Canada (d. 2021); Myron Scholes, financial economist and Nobel laureate, in Timmins, Ontario, Canada; Nicolae Saramandu, Aromanian linguist and philologist in Romania

== July 2, 1941 (Wednesday) ==
- The Germans and Romanians launched Operation München on the Eastern Front.
- The German heavy cruiser Prinz Eugen was damaged while docked in Brest, France during an Allied air raid.
- The arrival of SS Einsatzkommando 9 in Vilnius (Lithuania, within Reichskommissariat Ostland) began the Ponary massacre, the systematic murder of up to 100,000 Jews and others over the following three years, many by Ypatingasis būrys and other Lithuanian collaborators.
- China broke off diplomatic relations with Germany and Italy.
- Joe DiMaggio hit a home run off Dick Newsome of the Boston Red Sox to extend his hitting streak to 45 consecutive games and take sole possession of the major league record.
- The biographical film Sergeant York about the life of Alvin C. York was released, starring Gary Cooper in the title role.
- The television show CBS Television Quiz premiered on the fledgling CBS Television network. It was the first live TV game show ever to be broadcast regularly.

== July 3, 1941 (Thursday) ==
- The Battle of Białystok–Minsk ended in German victory. 290,000 Soviet troops with 2,500 tanks surrendered in the Białystok pocket.
- The Battle of Deir ez-Zor was fought in Syria, resulting in Allied victory.
- Italian General Pietro Gazzera surrendered to Belgian Congolese forces after his stronghold at Saio in the Ethiopian Highlands was surrounded.
- Joseph Stalin made a broadcast calling on the people of the Soviet Union to pursue a scorched earth policy and conduct guerrilla warfare against the invaders.
- German submarine U-577 was commissioned.
- Born: Gloria Allred, civil rights lawyer, in Philadelphia; Adoor Gopalakrishnan, filmmaker, in Pallickal, Adoor, British India
- Died: Friedrich Akel, 69, Estonian diplomat (executed); Otto Lancelle, 56, first German general killed in action in the invasion of the Soviet Union

== July 4, 1941 (Friday) ==
- The Germans captured Ostrov in northern Russia and a bridge over the Dnieper at Rogatchev.
- U.S. President Franklin D. Roosevelt made an Independence Day broadcast warning that "the United States will never survive as a happy and fertile oasis of liberty surrounded by a cruel desert of dictatorship. And so it is that when we repeat the great pledge to our country and to our flag, it must be our deep conviction that we pledge as well our work, our will, and, if it be necessary, our very lives."
- The service comedy film Caught in the Draft starring Bob Hope and Dorothy Lamour was released.
- Died: Antoni Łomnicki, 60, Polish mathematician (killed in the Massacre of Lviv professors)

== July 5, 1941 (Saturday) ==
- Romanian forces captured Chernivtsi, Ukraine as part of Operation München
- The Battle of Damour began in French Lebanon.
- The Ecuadorian–Peruvian War began.
- The British troopship Anselm was sunk in the Atlantic Ocean by the German submarine U-96 with the loss of 254 of the 1,316 aboard.
- Claude Auchinleck took over as Commander-in-Chief, Middle East.
- German submarines U-133, U-208 and U-654 were commissioned.
- Born: Garry Kilworth, science fiction and fantasy author, in York, England

== July 6, 1941 (Sunday) ==
- The First Battle of Smolensk began on the Eastern Front.
- The New York Yankees unveiled a centerfield monument to Lou Gehrig at Yankee Stadium.
- Born: Harold Leighton Weller, conductor and music educator, in Dayton, Ohio

== July 7, 1941 (Monday) ==
- The 13th Panzer Division reached Berdychiv.
- The U.S. 1st Marine Brigade arrived in Iceland and relieved the British garrison there. President Roosevelt sent Congress a message explaining that the United States could not allow Germany to occupy Iceland because it would constitute a threat to Greenland, to shipping in the North Atlantic and to the steady flow of munitions to Britain which Congress had already freely approved as a matter of broad policy.
- Winston Churchill sent a letter to Stalin saying that there was "genuine admiration" in Britain for the "bravery and tenacity of the soldiers and the people" of the Soviet Union. Churchill also pledged, "We shall do everything to help you that time, geography and our growing resources allow." Stalin was unimpressed by the vagueness of the letter and responded by asking for a formal agreement, since he wanted to ensure that Britain would not stand aside while Germany and the Soviet Union destroyed each other.
- The Uprising in Serbia began when Žikica Jovanović Španac urged a crowd in the village of Bela Crkva to resistance, then shot two policemen and escaped.
- The uprising in eastern Herzegovina was suppressed after two weeks.
- On the fourth anniversary of the outbreak of the Second Sino-Japanese War, Chiang Kai-shek sent a message to friendly nations asking for "close co-operation with one another" to fight the Axis because "the war in the Far East is no longer to be viewed as merely a conflict between two nations, for the European and Asiatic Wars have now become closely interrelated. Scarcely a single country remains unaffected because this predatory group of powers excludes no country from the scope of its design to dominate the world by force."
- Born: Michael Howard, politician, in Gorseinon, Wales; Bill Oddie, musician, ornithologist and member of The Goodies comedy troupe, in Rochdale, England

== July 8, 1941 (Tuesday) ==
- German troops captured Pskov.
- American journalist Richard C. Hottelet was released from German custody in a prisoner exchange after spending almost four months in a Berlin jail on suspicion of espionage.
- German submarines U-86, U-161 and U-656 were commissioned.
- The American League beat the National League 7–5 in the ninth Major League Baseball All-Star Game at Briggs Stadium in Detroit. Ted Williams hit a walk-off home run with two out in the bottom of the ninth to give the AL the victory.

== July 9, 1941 (Wednesday) ==
- The Battle of Damour ended in Australian victory.
- The German 13th Panzer Division took the Ukrainian city of Zhytomyr.
- A brief discussion was held in the British House of Commons about the arrangement by the Nazis for P. G. Wodehouse to give weekly radio broadcasts from Germany to the United States. Foreign Affairs Secretary Anthony Eden said he would take into consideration the suggestion from Geoffrey Mander "to bring to the attention of Mr. Wodehouse and others the grave peril in which they place themselves by playing the Nazi game during the war."
- Born: Robert J. Frankel, horse trainer, in Brooklyn, New York (d. 2009)

== July 10, 1941 (Thursday) ==
- 13th Panzer Division reached the Irpin River, 10 miles from Kiev.
- The Finnish Army began the reconquest of Lake Ladoga.
- Stalin received a reply from Churchill accepting his request to work on reaching a formal agreement.
- German submarines U-503 and U-578 were commissioned.
- Died: Jelly Roll Morton, 50, American ragtime and early jazz pianist

== July 11, 1941 (Friday) ==
- German forces captured Vitebsk.
- The British destroyer HMS Defender was bombed and subsequently scuttled off Sidi Barrani by a Junkers Ju 88 dive bomber piloted by Gerhard Stamp.
- Hitler issued Directive No. 32, Plans following defeat of the Soviet Union.
- The Office of the Coordinator of Information was created in the United States. William J. Donovan was made its first head.
- Born: Wayne Bickerton, songwriter, record producer and music business executive, in Rhyl, Denbighshire, Wales (d. 2015); Tommy Vance, radio broadcaster, in Eynsham, Oxfordshire, England (d. 2005)
- Died: Arthur Evans, 90, English archaeologist

== July 12, 1941 (Saturday) ==
- The Battle of Beirut was fought, resulting in Allied victory.
- The Anglo-Soviet Agreement was signed in Moscow.
- XLI Panzer Corps reached the Plyussa River in northern Russia.
- Ettore Bastico replaced Italo Gariboldi as Commander-in-Chief of Axis forces in North Africa.
- Born: John Lahr, theater critic, in Los Angeles; Benny Parsons, race car driver and announcer, in Wilkes County, North Carolina (d. 2007)

== July 13, 1941 (Sunday) ==
- Soviet general Mikhail Kirponos began counterattacking against the Zhytomyr corridor.
- The first Spanish volunteers began leaving Spain for Germany.
- Clemens August Graf von Galen, Catholic Bishop of Münster in Germany, preached the first of 3 sermons against Nazi brutality.
- The D.C. Armory opened in Washington, D.C.
- Hollywood couple William Holden and Brenda Marshall were married at a resort near Las Vegas.
- Died: Eduard Norden, 72, German classical philologist and historian of religion

== July 14, 1941 (Monday) ==
- The Armistice of Saint Jean d'Acre was signed, ending the Syria–Lebanon Campaign in Allied victory.
- The Soviet 11th Army counterattacked against the LVI Panzer Corps at Soltsy.
- 6th Panzer Division achieved a bridgehead over the Narva River.
- The British troopship Georgic was bombed in the Gulf of Suez with the loss of 26 lives and beached.
- Born: Maulana Karenga, scholar and activist, in Parsonsburg, Maryland

== July 15, 1941 (Tuesday) ==
- The Battle of Uman began on the Eastern Front.
- During the Battle of Smolensk, 7th Panzer Division captured Yartsevo.
- Died: Max Kretzer, 87, German writer; Walter Ruttmann, 53, German film director (died of wounds sustained on the front line as a war photographer)

== July 16, 1941 (Wednesday) ==
- During the Battle of Smolensk, the city of Smolensk itself fell to the Germans.
- Hitler, Hermann Göring, Alfred Rosenberg, Wilhelm Keitel, Hans Lammers and Martin Bormann met at Hitler's headquarters to discuss German occupation policy.
- Joseph Stalin's eldest son Yakov Dzhugashvili was captured in battle by the Germans.
- A law in Vichy France limited Jews to only 2 percent of lawyers admitted to the bar.
- German submarine U-701 was commissioned.
- Born: Hans Wiegel, politician, in Amsterdam, Netherlands (d. 2025); Peter Minshall, Carnival Artist, in Georgetown, Guyana

== July 17, 1941 (Thursday) ==
- The Twin Pimples raid by British Commandos during the Siege of Tobruk began.
- XI Army Corps crossed the Dniester River.
- President Roosevelt enacted Proclamation 2497, which blacklisted 1,800 Latin American firms for aiding Germany or Italy.
- German submarine U-579 was commissioned.
- Joe DiMaggio's major league record hitting streak ended at 56 games when he failed to get a base hit against the Cleveland Indians.
- Virginia Woolf's final novel Between the Acts was published posthumously.
- Born: Morimichi Takagi, in Gifu City, Japan, Japanese baseball player and manager (Nagoya Chunichi Dragons) (d. 2020)

== July 18, 1941 (Friday) ==
- The Twin Pimples raid ended in British victory.
- Stalin wrote to Churchill again saying, "It seems to me that the military position of the Soviet Union, as well as that of Great Britain, would be considerably improved if there could be established a front against Hitler in the West- Northern France, and in the North- the Arctic."
- Yōsuke Matsuoka was replaced as Japanese Foreign Minister and replaced by Teijirō Toyoda.

== July 19, 1941 (Saturday) ==
- Joseph Stalin demoted Semyon Timoshenko as People's Commissar for Defense of the Soviet Union and assumed command himself.
- Tuskegee Army Air Field officially opened.
- Hitler issued Directive No. 33, Continuation of the War in the East.
- German submarines U-153 and U-375 were commissioned.
- Born: Neelie Kroes, politician, in Rotterdam, Netherlands
- Jasper and jinx first appeared as Tom and Jerry in The Midnight Snack.

== July 20, 1941 (Sunday) ==
- Just after midnight a message from Churchill was read over the air by a mysterious "Col. V. Britton" (actually BBC news editor Douglas Ritchie) calling upon the people of Nazi-occupied Europe to mobilize under the V for Victory campaign. Citizens of occupied Europe within the broadcast's range were urged to chalk letter V's in public places and tap out the Morse Code version of the letter – three dots and a dash – to make known their confidence in Allied victory.
- 10th Panzer Division occupied Yelnya.
- Churchill wrote back to Stalin explaining that opening a new front in the west was at present out of the question. "To attempt a landing in force would be to encounter a bloody repulse, and petty raids would only lead to fiascos doing far more harm than good to both of us", Churchill wrote. "You must remember that we have been fighting alone for more than a year, and that, though our resources are growing, and will grow fast from now on, we are at the utmost strain both at home and in the Middle East by land and air, and also that the Battle of the Atlantic, on which our life depends, and the movement of all our convoys in the teeth of the U-boat and Focke-Wulf blockade, strains our naval resources, great though they may be, to the utmost limit." Churchill did agree to conduct air and sea operations in the north to attack enemy shipping.
- The British submarine HMS Union was sunk in the Mediterranean southwest of Pantelleria by the Italian torpedo boat Circe.
- Died: Lew Fields, 73 or 74, American vaudeville performer, theatre manager and producer

== July 21, 1941 (Monday) ==
- The Luftwaffe bombed Moscow for the first time.
- President Roosevelt asked Congress to declare a full or limited national emergency as a means of retaining more members of reserve components of the U.S. Armed Forces, including the National Guard.
- Hitler visited the headquarters of Army Group North on the Eastern Front.
- German forces captured Vinnytsia.
- XLVIII Panzer Corps reached Monastyrishche.

== July 22, 1941 (Tuesday) ==
- Japan and Vichy France agreed to a mutual defense pact.
- 12,000 houses were flooded in Tokyo after nearly two weeks of heavy rain.
- The only footage that exists of the girl Anne Frank was taken, while observing a girlfriend on the day of her wedding. It was taken on Merwedeplain 37, south Amsterdam. Holland.
- Born: Vaughn Bodē, underground cartoonist and creator of Cheech Wizard, in Utica, New York (d. 1975); George Clinton, funk musician and producer, in Kannapolis, North Carolina
- Died: Dmitry Pavlov, 43, Soviet general (executed by the Soviets for losing the Battle of Białystok–Minsk)

== July 23, 1941 (Wednesday) ==
- The Vichy government of French Indochina agreed to allow Japanese troops to enter Indochina.
- Soviet forces counterattacked at Monastyrishche.
- During Operation Substance, the British destroyer HMS Fearless was torpedoed by Italian aircraft northeast of Bône, Algeria and scuttled.
- Born: Sergio Mattarella, 12th President of Italy, in Palermo, Sicily
- Died: José Quiñones Gonzales, 27, Peruvian military aviator (killed in action in the Ecuadorian–Peruvian war)

== July 24, 1941 (Thursday) ==
- On the Eastern Front, Operation München ended in Axis victory.
- Some 700 employees of the Alcan aluminum company went on strike in Arvida, Quebec, Canada. Since the industry had been classified as essential to the war effort, the strike was illegal.
- German submarines U-454 and U-580 were commissioned.
- Died: Rudolf Ramek, 60, 6th Chancellor of Austria

== July 25, 1941 (Friday) ==
- An executive order by President Roosevelt froze Japanese assets in the United States. At Chiang Kai-shek's request, the order was extended to Chinese assets as well.
- The Nazi occupation regime in the Baltic states called the Reichskommissariat Ostland was established.
- Lefty Grove of the Boston Red Sox notched his 300th career win in a 10–6 victory at Fenway Park over the Cleveland Indians.
- Born: Emmett Till, lynching victim (d. 1955); Manny Charlton, rock guitarist for Nazareth, in La Línea, Andalusia, Spain (d. 2022); Nate Thurmond, basketball player, in Akron, Ohio (d. 2016)
- Died: Allan Forrest, 55, American silent film actor

== July 26, 1941 (Saturday) ==
- Britain followed the United States in imposing economic sanctions on Japan and freezing all Japanese assets in areas under their control. Japan retaliated by freezing all U.S. and British assets in return.
- Douglas MacArthur was appointed to command U.S. forces in the Far East.
- The Nazis began to set up the Białystok Ghetto.
- Frustrated by the need for provincial approval to deploy troops to end the Arvida strike, Canadian Munitions and Supply Minister C. D. Howe submitted his resignation to Prime Minister King. At a subsequent cabinet meeting Howe agreed to withdraw his resignation on the condition that he be granted powers to deal with such emergency situations.
- German submarines U-116 and U-134 were commissioned.
- Died: Henri Lebesgue, 66, French mathematician

== July 27, 1941 (Sunday) ==
- German forces completed the encirclement of the Red Army at Smolensk and took 100,000 prisoners.
- The Germans captured Mogilev after a week-long siege.
- The Soviet Soobrazitelnyy-class destroyer Smelyi was sunk in the Gulf of Riga by the German motor torpedo boat S-54.
- British Commandos carried out Operation Chess, an overnight raid on Ambleteuse, France.
- Born: Bill Baxley, politician, in Dothan, Alabama

== July 28, 1941 (Monday) ==
- German forces captured Kingisepp near Leningrad.
- Finland broke off diplomatic relations with Great Britain.
- Actress Judy Garland married songwriter David Rose.
- Born: Peter Cullen, voice actor, in Montreal, Quebec, Canada; Riccardo Muti, conductor, in Naples, Italy; Rabbi Hershel Schachter, leading American Orthodox rabbi, in Scranton, PA.

== July 29, 1941 (Tuesday) ==
- Japan and Vichy France pledged military co-operation for joint defense of French Indochina.
- The Arvida strike ended when the Canadian government amended the Defence of Canada Regulations to allow the Minister of National Defence to call out troops to deal with labour disputes without requiring permission from municipal or provincial authorities. A subsequent royal commission concluded that while the strike was illegal, it was caused by workers' frustrations over salaries and working conditions rather than subversives as Munitions and Supply Minister C. D. Howe had claimed.
- Photographs of the Russian composer Dmitri Shostakovich as a firefighter were taken in Leningrad. The photographs were published around the world as a symbol of Soviet determination.
- Born: Jennifer Dunn, politician, in Seattle, Washington (d. 2007); David Warner, actor, in Manchester, England (d. 2022)
- Died: James Stephenson, 52, British actor

== July 30, 1941 (Wednesday) ==
- The British Fleet Air Arm launched the raid on Kirkenes and Petsamo, but it was unsuccessful.
- German 6th Army made its first direct assault on the city of Kiev.
- The Sikorski–Mayski agreement was signed between the Soviet Union and the Polish government-in-exile.
- Hitler issued Directive No. 34, Strengthening Soviet resistance.
- The British mine-laying submarine HMS Cachalot was rammed and sunk in the Mediterranean Sea by the Italian torpedo boat Generale Achille Papa.
- German submarine U-504 was commissioned.
- Born: Paul Anka, singer, in Ottawa, Ontario, Canada
- Died: Mickey Welch, 82, American baseball player

== July 31, 1941 (Thursday) ==
- The Finnish reconquest of the Karelian Isthmus began.
- The Ecuadorian–Peruvian War ended in a cease-fire.
- Ludwig Crüwell was put in overall charge of the Afrika Korps, while Erwin Rommel took control of the newly created Panzer Armee Afrika.
- Hermann Göring authorized Reinhard Heydrich to prepare the implementation of "a total solution of the Jewish Question in the area of German influence in Europe."
- German submarine U-581 was commissioned.
- Born: Amarsinh Chaudhary, politician, in Surat, Gujarat, British India (d. 2004)
