= VPB-125 =

Patrol Bombing Squadron 125
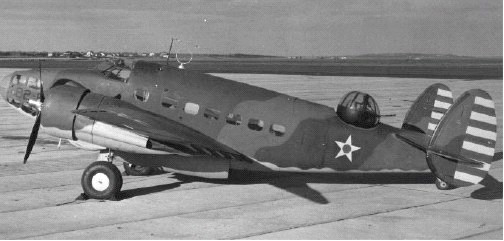
- VP-82 PBO-1 at NAS Argentia, January 1942
- Active: 1 September 1938 – 8 June 1945
- Country: United States of America
- Branch: United States Navy
- Type: squadron
- Role: Maritime patrol
- Engagements: World War II

Aircraft flown
- Patrol: P2Y-3; PBY-3/4/5A; PBO-1; PV-1

VPB-125 was a Patrol Bombing Squadron of the U.S. Navy. The squadron was established as Patrol Squadron 20 (VP-20) on 1 September 1938, redesignated Patrol Squadron 44 (VP-44) on 1 July 1940, redesignated Patrol Squadron 61 (VP-61) on 6 January 1941, redesignated Patrol Squadron 82 (VP-82) on 1 July 1941, redesignated Bombing Squadron 125 (VB-125) on 1 March 1943, redesignated Patrol Bombing Squadron 125 (VPB-125) on 1 October 1944 and disestablished on 8 June 1945.

== Operational history ==
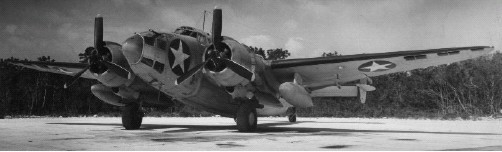
VPB-125 PV-1, 1943

- 1 September 1938: VP-20 was established at NAS Seattle, Washington, flying the P2Y-3 seaplane, under operational control of PatWing-4.
- January 1940: The squadron deployed a detachment to Sitka, Alaska, to test new wing deicers. During the testing, tender support was provided by USS Teal.
- 6 January 1941: The squadron was redesignated VP-61 and transferred to NAS Alameda, California, under operational control of PatWing-6.
- 1 June 1941: The squadron was transferred to NAS Norfolk, Virginia, the last plane arrived there on 11 June 1941.
- 15 August 1941: VP-82 was transferred to NAS Floyd Bennett Field, New York, under the operational control of PatWing-8. The squadron began a period of Anti-submarine warfare (ASW) and search tactics training. Crews were alternated for four days of indoctrination training aboard tender USS Pocomoke at Gardner, Long Island.
- 15 October – November 1941: the squadron was transferred to NAS Norfolk, under PatWing-5. By 28 October 1941, the squadron had received its full allotment of 15 aircraft and was relocated again, this time to NAS Quonset Point, Rhode Island. This squadron probably set a record for patrol squadrons during the war in the greatest number of aircraft exchanges in a six-month period. An article in the squadron newsletter dated 2 August 1941 read, "It is believed that this squadron has the distinction of completing the greatest number of reassignments of aircraft in the shortest time. From the period 29 March to 26 July (less than four months) four complete new assignments of airplanes, including spare parts, have been accomplished. The models assigned included P2Y-3, PBY-3, PBY-4 and PBY-5. Up to date, no repeat on any one plane has resulted. It is felt that this record should stand for some time but any squadron desiring to become a competitor for the honor should do so with circumspect." Three months after the article was published the squadron transitioned to a fifth model, the PBO-1. From October through 11 November 1941, the squadron's 40 pilots accompanied Army crews in Lockheed Hudson bombers flying from the factory at Burbank, California, to Norfolk. This training was for transition from the Navy's PBY Catalina flying boats to the Hudson bomber, designated by the Navy as PBO-1s. Assignment of these aircraft, originally destined for the British and painted with British markings, was the beginning of what became an extensive use of landplanes by patrol squadrons during the war and, although it was not yet apparent, was the first move toward the eventual elimination of the flying boat from patrol aviation.
- 1 January – May 1942: Twelve aircraft of VP-82 were transferred to NAS Argentia, Newfoundland, to provide convoy coverage, harbor patrol and ASW sweeps. The squadron came under the operational control of PatWing-7 while at NAS Argentia and NAS Quonset Point. The crews were berthed during this period aboard USS Pocomoke. From January through May, the crews began shifting to other tenders, including USS George E. Badger and USS Barnegat. The berthing situation stabilized on 22 May 1942, when the crews were berthed ashore at the air station barracks.
- 28 January 1942: The squadron claimed a U-boat sunk off Cape Race, however postwar examination of enemy records do not indicate any losses during that period.
- 1 March 1942: A second U-boat was claimed sunk by Ensign Tepuni flying a PBO-1 Hudson, also near Cape Race. German Navy records indicate that this was U-656, with a crew of 45. U-656 was the first German submarine sinking attributed to U.S. forces in WWII.
- 15 March 1942: VP-82 claimed a heavy damage assessment on a German submarine off Cape Race. Postwar examination of German records indicate that U-503 was actually sunk by the squadron.
- 28 May 1942: A three-aircraft detachment returned to NAS Quonset Point. On 30 May a second three-aircraft detachment from NAS Argentia was sent to NAS Norfolk. A few PBY-5A Catalinas were added to the squadron's complement at NAS Quonset Point for patrol duties.
- 8 June 1942: Three aircraft departed NAS Quonset Point for NAS Jacksonville, Florida.
- 9 June 1942: VP-82 was transferred from the operational control of PatWing-7 to PatWing-9. On the same day, the remaining aircraft at NAS Quonset Point were flown to NAS Jacksonville. Upon arrival on 11 June, the detachment began convoy coverage patrols with VP-94.
- 10 June 1942: The NAS Argentia detachment of six PBOs rejoined the squadron headquarters at NAS Quonset Point.
- 16 June 1942: The six-aircraft detachment at NAS Jacksonville completed its operations with VP-94. Three aircraft returned to NAS Norfolk for patrol duties, the other three returned to NAS Quonset Point.
- 23 July 1942: No. 53 Squadron RAF joined the Quonset Air Detachment. The British patrol squadron assisted VP-82 in convoy patrol, ASW sweeps and photo flights.
- 11 August 1942: A detachment of one officer and 76 enlisted personnel departed NAS Norfolk aboard SS Mermah for an advanced base at Trinidad. Five aircraft of No. 53 Squadron departed from MCAS Cherry Point, North Carolina, to join the detachment at Trinidad, followed by nine VP-82 aircraft from NAS Norfolk on 13 and 15 August. At Trinidad, the detachment came under the operational control of PatWing-11.
- 29 September 1942: The NAS Quonset Point squadron headquarters detachment began to transition from the PBO to the PV-1 Ventura twin-engine medium bomber, an improved successor to the PBO Hudson, with upgraded avionics and more powerful engines.
- 15 November 1942: The NAS Quonset Point headquarters detachment of VP-82, 12 aircraft, and a few RAF aircraft of No. 53 Squadron deployed to NAS Argentia. ASW patrols and convoy coverage began on 17 November.
- 27 April 1943: A squadron aircraft attacked U-174, on the surface near Cape Race. The U-boat heavily damaged the Ventura with its 20-mm anti-aircraft guns before sinking.
- 17 June 1943: VB-125 returned to NAS Quonset Point, from its deployment to NAS Argentia. It is believed the Trinidad detachment rejoined the parent organization during this period and was included in the reforming and retraining taking place.
- 4 July 1943: VB-125 transferred to NAS Boca Chica, Florida. The squadron provided ASW coverage and convoy patrols from Tampa, Banana River and Miami, Florida, Camagüey and Nassau.
- 1 October 1943: A three-aircraft detachment was sent to NAF San Julián, Cuba, for ASW patrols.
- 1 May 1944: VB-125 transferred from NAS Boca Chica, to NAF San Julián, Cuba, joining the detachment sent there previously. The squadron continued under the operational control of FAW-12.
- 11 February – March 1945: The squadron was relieved by VPB-145 and received orders to deploy to NAF Natal, Brazil, under the operational control of FAW-16. The squadron arrived at NAF Natal on the 18th, and began barrier sweeps on the 28th. During March, the squadron maintained detachments at Fortaleza, Fernando de Noronha and RAF Ascension Island. The detachments rejoined the squadron at NAF Natal at the end of March.
- 27 April – May 1945: VPB-125 began its relocation to NAS Elizabeth City, North Carolina, arriving on 30 April. The squadron came under the operational control of FAW9. During the month of May the squadron maintained a six-aircraft detachment at NAS Brunswick, Maine.
- 1 June 1945: The Brunswick detachment rejoined the squadron at NAS Elizabeth City in preparation for disestablishment.
- 8 June 1945: VPB-125 was disestablished.

== Aircraft assignments ==
The squadron was assigned the following aircraft, effective on the dates shown:

- P2Y-3 - September 1938
- PBY-3 - March 1941
- PBY-4 - April 1941
- PBY-5 - May 1941
- PBO-1 - November 1941
- PBY-5A - May 1942
- PV-1 - September 1942

== Home port assignments ==
The squadron was assigned to these home ports, effective on the dates shown:

- NAS Seattle, Washington - 1 September 1938
- NAS Alameda, California - 6 January 1941
- NAS Norfolk, Virginia - 1 June 1941
- NAS Floyd Bennett Field, New York - 15 August 1941
- NAS Norfolk - 15 October 1941
- NAS Quonset Point, Rhode Island - 28 October 1941
- NAS Boca Chica, Florida - 4 July 1943
- NAF San Julián, Cuba - 1 May 1944
- NAF Natal, Brazil - 11 February 1945
- NAS Elizabeth City, North Carolina - 30 April 1945

== See also ==
- Maritime patrol aircraft
- List of inactive United States Navy aircraft squadrons
- List of United States Navy aircraft squadrons
- List of squadrons in the Dictionary of American Naval Aviation Squadrons
- History of the United States Navy
