= August 1941 =

Month of 1941

<<	August 1941					>>
Su	Mo	Tu	We	Th	Fr	Sa
					1	2
3	4	5	6	7	8	9
10	11	12	13	14	15	16
17	18	19	20	21	22	23
24	25	26	27	28	29	30
31

The following events occurred in August 1941:

== August 1, 1941 (Friday) ==
- U.S. President Franklin D. Roosevelt announced an embargo on the export of oil and aviation fuel to anywhere outside the Western Hemisphere with the exception of the British Empire. This action was aimed at Japan.
- The second wave of Alikianos executions were carried out on Crete.
- The Bialystok District of Nazi Germany was created.
- German submarine U-154 was commissioned.
- Born: Ron Brown, American Politician, in Washington, D.C. (d. 1996)

== August 2, 1941 (Saturday) ==
- The United States extended Lend-Lease to apply to the Soviet Union.
- Britain called on the governments of Iran and Afghanistan to expel all Germans immediately.
- All civilian radios in Norway were confiscated by the Nazi occupation authorities.
- Born: Ede Staal, singer-songwriter, in Warffum, Netherlands (d. 1986)

== August 3, 1941 (Sunday) ==
- German 16th Panzer and 1st Mountain Divisions linked up at Pervomaisk and closed the Uman pocket.
- The German Catholic Bishop Clemens August Graf von Galen gave a sermon condemning the Nazi practice of euthanasia. Thousands of copies of the sermon were distributed throughout Germany, breaking the secrecy that surrounded the euthanasia programme known as Aktion T4.
- German submarine U-401 was sunk in the Atlantic Ocean by depth charges from Allied warships.
- Born: Martha Stewart, businesswoman and television personality, in Jersey City, New Jersey; Hage Geingob, 3rd President of Namibia, in Otjiwarongo, South-West Africa (d. 2024)

== August 4, 1941 (Monday) ==
- Kirovohrad fell to the Germans.
- Adolf Hitler met with Fedor von Bock, Heinz Guderian and Hermann Hoth. All three generals agreed that a drive on Moscow should be top priority and could commence as early as August 20, but Hitler favoured other objectives such as the elimination of enemy pockets.
- Born: Ted Strickland, politician, in Lucasville, Ohio
- Died: Mihály Babits, 57, Hungarian poet, writer and translator

== August 5, 1941 (Tuesday) ==
- The First Battle of Smolensk ended in German victory. 310,000 Soviets were taken prisoner.
- The Provisional Government of Lithuania disbanded.

== August 6, 1941 (Wednesday) ==
- In the British House of Commons, British Foreign Secretary Anthony Eden warned Japan that any action threatening the independence and integrity of Thailand would be "of immediate concern" to the British government. U.S. Secretary of State Cordell Hull mirrored those statements that same day when he said at a press conference that any move by Japan into Thailand would be a matter of concern to the United States.
- The Ustaše regime in the Independent State of Croatia perpetrated the Prebilovci massacre, throwing some 600 women and children alive into a deep pit near Šurmanci.
- German submarine U-404 was commissioned.
- Born: Lyle Berman, professional poker player and business executive, in Minneapolis, Minnesota

== August 7, 1941 (Thursday) ==
- U.S. President Franklin D. Roosevelt arrived at Placentia Bay, Newfoundland aboard the heavy cruiser USS Augusta, ostensibly on vacation but actually to hold a conference with Winston Churchill.
- The Australian government warned that it would not stand by and watch Japanese expansion in the Pacific.
- Japan denied having any aggressive intentions against Thailand.
- Twin-engine bombers of the Soviet Navy raided Berlin.
- German submarine U-582 was commissioned.
- The romantic comedy-fantasy film Here Comes Mr. Jordan starring Robert Montgomery, Evelyn Keyes and Claude Rains premiered at the Radio City Music Hall in New York City.
- The comedy horror film Hold That Ghost starring Abbott and Costello premiered in New York.
- Died: Bruno Mussolini, 23, son of Benito Mussolini (plane crash); Rabindranath Tagore, 80, Bengali polymath

== August 8, 1941 (Friday) ==
- The Battle of Uman ended in Axis victory.
- The Siege of Odessa began.
- German forces began a general offensive on the Luga River.
- The Soviet Izyaslav-class destroyer Karl Marx was bombed and sunk in Loksa Bay by the Luftwaffe.
- The Japanese aircraft carrier Shōkaku was commissioned.
- Born: George Tiller, physician, in Wichita, Kansas (d. 2009) Jeffery Flaws Calgary, Alberta Ultrarunner

== August 9, 1941 (Saturday) ==
- Winston Churchill arrived at Placentia Bay aboard the battleship HMS Prince of Wales and ferried over to Roosevelt's ship for their first meeting.
- British fighter ace Douglas Bader was forced to bail out of his damaged Spitfire Mk VA over northern France in controversial circumstances and was captured. Some accounts have his plane being involved in a mid-air collision with a Bf 109, but it is also possible he was shot down or was a victim of friendly fire.
- Charles Lindbergh made a speech in Cleveland in which he accused American interventionists of plotting to create "incidents and situations" that would plunge the United States into war "under the guise of defending America."
- The Germans killed 534 Jews in Kaunas.
- Born: Shirlee Busbee, romance novelist, in San Jose, California

== August 10, 1941 (Sunday) ==
- The German submarine German submarine U-144 (1940) was sunk in the Gulf of Finland by the Soviet submarine ShCh-307.
- The Soviet patrol boat Tuman was sunk by shellfire off the Kola Peninsula by German destroyers.
- President Roosevelt and his representatives came aboard the Prince of Wales for a Sunday prayer service with Churchill, who later recalled the event as "a deeply moving expression of the unity of faith of our two peoples." Churchill selected the hymns himself, ending with "Our God, Our Help in Ages Past".
- Died: Arthur Mülverstedt, 47, German SS General (killed in action near Luga)

== August 11, 1941 (Monday) ==
- 14 large Soviet bombers raided Berlin.
- The Red Army counterattacked around Yelnya.
- The Italian hospital ship California was sunk off Syracuse, Sicily by Fairey Swordfish torpedo aircraft of 830 Naval Air Squadron.
- German submarine U-655 was commissioned.
- A famous pin-up photo of Rita Hayworth appeared in this week's issue of Life magazine, showing Hayworth perched on her bed wearing a negligee. The iconic picture was the second-most popular among US servicemen during World War II. Only Betty Grable's over-the-shoulder photo from 1943 was bigger.

== August 12, 1941 (Tuesday) ==
- Vichy French Vice-Premier François Darlan was made the Minister of Defence. President Philippe Pétain made an address announcing the appointment in which he also announced a series of harsh new measures including the dissolution all political parties, the creation of a Council of Justice to judge "those responsible for our disaster," and the new requirement that all ministers and high officials swear an oath of loyalty directly to him. "In 1917 I put an end to mutiny," Pétain said. "In 1940 I put an end to rout. Today I wish to save you from yourselves."
- The Placentia Bay meetings between Roosevelt and Churchill concluded. The Atlantic Charter was signed but not made public until two days later.
- The Royal Air Force conducted the heaviest daylight bombing raid against Germany since the war began. The Germans could not offer as much opposition as they once did because many of their planes had been diverted to the Eastern Front.
- By the margin of a single vote, the United States House of Representatives approved an 18-month extension of the Selective Training and Service Act of 1940.
- The British corvette Picotee was sunk in the North Atlantic by the German submarine U-568.
- The USSR issued the Amnesty for Polish citizens in the Soviet Union.
- The Canadian government ordered all Japanese Canadians to carry a registration card.
- Born: Deborah Walley, actress, in Bridgeport, Connecticut (d. 2001)
- Died: Bobby Peel, 84, English cricketer

== August 13, 1941 (Wednesday) ==
- The Roosevelt Administration issued an executive order suspending the eight-hour day for mechanics and laborers employed by the War Department on public works projects such as airfields, troop housing units and fortifications so as to hasten their construction.
- Ostland Reichkommissar Hinrich Lohse ordered that all property belonging to Jews was to be confiscated and registered, and all money and valuables in their possession handed over immediately.
- The Canadian government authorized the creation of the Canadian Women's Army Corps (CWAC).
- The Australian Women's Army Service (AWAS) was raised.
- The soybean car, an automobile made with a plastic body at the behest of Henry Ford, was introduced to the public at a community festival in Dearborn, Michigan.
- Died: J. Stuart Blackton, 66, English-born American film producer

== August 14, 1941 (Thursday) ==
- Franklin D. Roosevelt and Winston Churchill jointly issued the Atlantic Charter, stating the Allied goals for the post-war world.
- German forces captured Krivoy Rog.
- British bombers conducted an overnight raid on the railway yards at Hanover.
- German submarine U-583 was commissioned.
- Born:
  - David Crosby, musician, in Los Angeles, California (d. 2023)
  - Connie Smith, country musician, in Elkhart, Indiana
- Died: Maximilian Kolbe, 47, Polish friar who volunteered to die in place of a stranger in the Auschwitz concentration camp; Paul Sabatier, 86, French chemist

== August 15, 1941 (Friday) ==
- The Philippine Army Air Corps was officially inducted into the United States Army Forces in the Far East.
- Roosevelt and Churchill sent a joint message of assistance to the Soviet Union. "We realize fully how vitally important to the defeat of Hitlerism is the brave and steadfast resistance of the Soviet Union and we feel therefore that we must not in any circumstances fail to act quickly and immediately in this matter on planning the program for the future allocation of our joint resources," the statement concluded.
- Born: Don Rich, country musician, in Olympia, Washington (d. 1974)
- Died: Josef Jakobs, 43, German spy (executed at the Tower of London by firing squad)

== August 16, 1941 (Saturday) ==
- The Germans occupied the important Soviet naval base at Mykolaiv and captured warships, ammunition and repair facilities.
- The Defense Base Act was enacted in the United States.
- German submarine U-135 was commissioned.
- Order No. 270 was issued by Joseph Stalin
- Born: Théoneste Bagosora, military officer, in Giciye, Western Province, Rwanda (d. 2021); David Dickinson, antiques expert and television presenter, in Stockport, Cheshire, England

== August 17, 1941 (Sunday) ==
- German forces captured Novgorod.
- The Germans captured the Estonian city of Narva.
- The Spanish freighter Navemar left Lisbon with 1,180 refugees, mostly Jewish, bound for Cuba and New York. The ship was very overcrowded as it was built to carry only 15 passengers, and it soon acquired the nickname "the floating concentration camp".
- Born: Ibrahim Babangida, President of Nigeria, in Minna, Colonial Nigeria; Lothar Bisky, politician, in Zollbrück, Germany (d. 2013); Boog Powell, baseball player, in Lakeland, Florida; Fritz Wepper, actor, in Munich, Germany (d. 2024)

== August 18, 1941 (Monday) ==
- The Germans reached the Ukrainian city of Zaporizhia. The Red Army dynamited the Dnieper Hydroelectric Station to delay the enemy from getting across the Dnieper, resulting in many civilian and military deaths.
- The British submarine HMS P32 was sunk by a naval mine of Tripoli.
- The British submarine HMS P33 was lost to enemy action in the Mediterranean Sea.
- The Nazis arrested over 300 Swing Kids in Hamburg. Most were sent home and some had their long hair cut as punishment, but the suspected leaders of the swing youth were imprisoned in concentration camps or sent to the front lines.
- Radio Belgrade played an obscure two-year-old German song called "Lili Marleen" sung by Lale Andersen. The song was an instant hit and became one of the most popular songs of the war among Axis and Allied troops alike fighting in North Africa.

== August 19, 1941 (Tuesday) ==
- The Germans captured Gomel in Belarus, and Kherson in Ukraine.
- 449 men of the U.S. Marine Corps 1st Defense Battalion established the first permanent military garrison at Wake Island.
- The British troopship Aguila was torpedoed and sunk in the Atlantic Ocean by German submarine U-201.
- The British destroyer HNoMS Bath escorting convoy OG 71 was sunk by German submarine U-204.
- German submarine U-87 was commissioned.
- Germany and Romania sign the Tiraspol Agreement.
- Died: Samuel Tyszelman, 20, Polish-born Jewish Communist and member of the French Resistance (executed)

== August 20, 1941 (Wednesday) ==
- The German 17th Army gained a bridgehead over the Dnieper at Kremenchuk.
- The second mass round-up of Jews in Paris began at the request of the Gestapo's Jewish Affairs Department. Over the next five days a total of 4,232 Jews were arrested.
- The drama film The Little Foxes starring Bette Davis premiered at the Radio City Music Hall in New York.
- Born: Slobodan Milošević, President of the Federal Republic of Yugoslavia, in Požarevac, Kingdom of Yugoslavia (d. 2006)
- Died: John Baird, 1st Viscount Stonehaven, 67, British politician and 8th Governor-General of Australia

== August 21, 1941 (Thursday) ==
- The Germans captured the Ukrainian port city of Kherson.
- Hitler ordered Army Group North to encircle Leningrad, believing that the loss of the symbolic capital of the Russian Revolution would deal a crushing blow to Soviet morale.
- The Bila Tserkva massacre took place in the Ukrainian city of Bila Tserkva.
- Drancy internment camp officially opened in France.
- In revenge for the execution two days earlier of the French Resistance member Samuel Tyszelman, communist activist Pierre Georges assassinated German naval cadet Alfons Moser at the Barbès – Rochechouart metro station in Paris by shooting him in the back. This marked the beginning of a cycle of assassinations by Resistance fighters and retribution from authorities that would claim hundreds of lives.
- German submarines U-376 and U-584 were commissioned.
- The musical film Sun Valley Serenade starring Sonja Henie and John Payne was released in the United States.

== August 22, 1941 (Friday) ==
- German forces occupied Cherkasy.
- The Communist Law was passed in Nazi-occupied Denmark, banning the Communist Party of Denmark and other communist organizations.
- A German order signed by Otto von Stülpnagel decreed that in response to the previous day's assassination of a member of the German Armed Forces, all Frenchmen detained by or on behalf of German authorities would be considered as hostages. If any further incident occurred, a number of these hostages were to be shot.
- Joseph Stalin decreed that every Soviet soldier at the front should receive 100 grams of vodka per day.
- Born: Bill Parcells, American football coach, in Englewood, New Jersey
- Died: Adna R. Chaffee, Jr., 56, American major general

== August 23, 1941 (Saturday) ==
- The First Battle of Kiev began.
- Heinz Guderian met with Hitler at the Wolf's Lair with a large number of other officers present. Guderian was allowed to present his reasons for continuing to advance on Moscow, but after he finished Hitler gave his own reasons for concentrating on the south until Kiev was in German hands. The other officers nodded in agreement with each of Hitler's points, and it became obvious to Guderian that the decision had already been made.
- The Finnish reconquest of Ladoga Karelia was completed.
- Canadian Prime Minister William Lyon Mackenzie King made a speech to 10,000 Canadian troops in Aldershot, England. Some of the soldiers, tired of endless training exercises and anxious to see some action, booed and heckled the Prime Minister.
- The British corvette HMS Zinnia of convoy OG 71 was sunk by German submarine U-564.
- Marshal Pétain established Vichy military courts with the authority to impose the death penalty for acts of terrorism and sabotage.
- German submarine U-155 was commissioned.
- Born: Bunny Lee, reggae record producer, in Kingston, Jamaica (d. 2020)

== August 24, 1941 (Sunday) ==
- The German 6th Army reached Desna.
- Hitler ordered the cancellation of Aktion T4 due to public backlash.
- Winston Churchill broadcast a message to the world about his recent meeting with President Roosevelt and the signing of the Atlantic Charter. Churchill explained that the Charter differed from the attitude adopted by the Allies in the latter part of World War I because it did not assume that there would never be any war again, and "that instead of trying to ruin German trade by all kinds of additional trade barriers and hindrances, as was the mood of 1917, we have definitely adopted the view that it is not in the interests of the world and of our two countries that any large nation should be unprosperous or shut out from the means of making a decent living for itself and its people by its industry and enterprise."
- Soviet cargo ship VT-532 was bombed by the Luftwaffe during the evacuation of Tallinn and was grounded near Prangli Island. 44 passengers and crew were killed in the bombardment.
- Died: Theodore Mavrogordato, 58, British tennis player

== August 25, 1941 (Monday) ==
- The Anglo-Soviet invasion of Iran began.
- Tykocin pogrom: About 1,400 to 1,700 Jewish residents of Tykocin in occupied Poland were taken to nearby Łopuchowo forest and massacred by the SS.
- The Allies launched Operation Gauntlet, a raid on the Norwegian island of Spitsbergen.
- Pierre Laval narrowly escaped an assassination attempt by a student as he was seeing off French volunteers going to fight alongside the Germans in Russia. One of the four bullets that struck him missed his heart by about an inch.
- Benito Mussolini visited the Wolf's Lair for the first time. Mussolini would stay in the area until August 29 - his longest visit of the war - touring battle sites, reviewing troops and meeting with German officials.
- German submarine U-452 was sunk in the North Atlantic with depth charges by British aircraft and the anti-submarine trawler HMS Vascama.
- German submarine U-333 was commissioned.
- Died: Hermann-Friedrich Joppien, 29, German fighter ace (killed in action on the Eastern Front)

== August 26, 1941 (Tuesday) ==
- The Germans captured Dnipropetrovsk.
- XLVII Panzer Corps captured Chernobyl.
- German submarine U-505 was commissioned.
- Born: Barbara Ehrenreich, author and political activist, in Butte, Montana (d. 2022)

== August 27, 1941 (Wednesday) ==
- The Soviet evacuation of Tallinn began.
- The Kamianets-Podilskyi massacre began.
- Mohammad Ali Foroughi became Prime Minister of Iran for the third time.
- South of Iceland, the German U-boat U-570 was attacked, damaged and captured by the British on her first patrol. The submarine would be put back into service by the Royal Navy as HMS Graph.
- Born: Cesária Évora, singer, in Mindelo, Cape Verde (d. 2011)

== August 28, 1941 (Thursday) ==
- German XLII Corps captured Tallinn.
- The Izyaslav-class destroyer Kalinin, Soobrazitelnyy-class destroyer Skoryi, Orfey-class destroyer Volodarski and Novik-class destroyer Yakov Sverdlov were all among the Soviet ships that struck naval mines and sank in the Baltic Sea during the evacuation of Tallinn.
- Stalin decreed the Volga German Autonomous Soviet Socialist Republic abolished.
- The Kamianets-Podilskyi massacre ended with a total of 23,600 Jews killed.
- During a flight from Uman to Lvov carrying Hitler, Mussolini, Himmler, Ribbentrop and others, Mussolini asked to pilot the aircraft himself. Hitler was so surprised that he said nothing and managed only an awkward smile. Since no one was willing to voice an objection, Mussolini took the controls and flew the plane himself for over an hour while everyone else on board was made extremely nervous.
- The German submarine U-570 was beached and captured at Þorlákshöfn, Iceland after being forced to the surface by depth charges from a Lockheed Hudson of 269 Squadron the day before. The British later put the submarine back into service as HMS Graph.
- German submarines U-352, U-585 and U-754 were commissioned.
- The Office of Price Administration was created in the United States.
- Born: Syed Mahmood Naqvi, Earth scientist, in Amroha, British India (d. 2009)

== August 29, 1941 (Friday) ==
- Finnish forces retook Viipuri.
- Arthur Fadden became 13th Prime Minister of Australia.
- The Government of National Salvation succeeded the Commissioner Government as the puppet government in the Territory of the Military Commander in Serbia.
- Charles Lindbergh said at an America First Committee rally in Oklahoma City that Britain might turn against the United States "as she has turned against France and Finland." Montana Senator Burton K. Wheeler spoke next and said, "If our interventionists want to free a country from the dominion of another country, we ought to declare war on Great Britain to free India. I have never seen such slavery as I saw in India a few years ago." Many Americans started turning against Lindbergh at this time, as Gallup polling showed that the public favored the president's specific interventionist moves.
- Born: Ellen Geer, actress, director and professor, in New York City; Robin Leach, entertainment reporter and writer, in Perivale, London, England (d. 2018)

== August 30, 1941 (Saturday) ==
- The Yelnya Offensive began on the Eastern Front when the Soviets began a counterattack southeast of Smolensk.
- The Germans captured Mga, the last rail link out of Leningrad.
- British Commandos executed Operation Acid Drop, an overnight raid on Pas-de-Calais, France.
- German submarines U-136, U-213 and U-435 were commissioned.
- "Green Eyes (Aquellos Ojos Verdes)" by Jimmy Dorsey and His Orchestra went to #1 on the Billboard singles charts.
- Germany and Romania sign the Tighina Agreement.
- Born: Ben Jones, actor (The Dukes of Hazzard) and politician, in Tarboro, North Carolina
- Died: Peder Oluf Pedersen, 67, Danish engineer and physicist

== August 31, 1941 (Sunday) ==
- The Soviet evacuation of Tallinn ended.
- The Battle of Loznica was fought in Serbia between the German occupiers and the Chetniks. The Chetniks captured Loznica and established a command post in the town.
- A Soviet counterattack retook Mga.
- Died: Thomas Bavin, 67, 24th Premier of New South Wales; Marina Tsvetaeva, 48, Russian poet (suicide)
