= Cuban Revolutionary Air and Air Defense Force =

Air warfare branch of Cuba's military

Revolutionary Anti-Air Defence and Air Force
- Defensa Anti-Aérea y Fuerza Aérea Revolucionaria
- The emblem of the Cuban Armed Forces
- Founded: 1959; 67 years ago
- Country: Cuba
- Type: Air force
- Role: Aerial defence Aerial warfare
- Size: 8,000 personnel
- Part of: Revolutionary Armed Forces
- Nickname: DAAFAR

Commanders
- Notable commanders: Major General Pedro Mendiondo Gómez

Insignia
- Roundel

- Fin flash

Aircraft flown
- Attack helicopter: Mil Mi-24
- Trainer: Aero L-39
- Transport: An-24, Mil Mi-8, Mil Mi-17

The Cuban Revolutionary Air and Air Defense Force (Spanish: Defensa Anti-Aérea y Fuerza Aérea Revolucionaria) commonly abbreviated to DAAFAR in both Spanish and English, is the air force of Cuba.

== History ==
=== Background ===
The Cuerpo de Aviación del Ejército de Cuba (CAEC) (in English, Cuban Army Aviation Corps) was formed on 5 July 1913 with one Curtiss F flying boat. The 1.Escuadrón was formed on 18 May 1919 with nine Curtiss JN-4D Jenny trainers. On 18 April 1932 CAEC aircraft bombed US-backed rebel forces opposing Gerardo Machado in the town of Gibara. Those forces subsequently abandoned the town.

In 1934, responsibility for naval aviation was split from the CAEC, with the creation of the Aviación Naval.

In 1939, the Escuadrón de Persecución (Pursuit Squadron) operated Vought O2U Corsair bombers, Curtiss Hawk II fighters, and Vought Kingfisher floatplanes from Campo Brihuegas in Havana. The Escuadrón de Observación y Bombardeo (Observation and bombing Squadron) operated the Waco S3HD and Lockheed Sirius from the same location. The Escuela de Aviación Militar (Military Aviation School) operated a Curtiss-Wright CW-19 from the Campo de Columbia, that was also in Havana.

The CAEC was reorganized as the Fuerza Aérea del Ejército de Cuba (FAEC) (Cuban Army Air Force), recombining army and naval operations, on 23 April 1952 following Fulgencio Batista US-backed coup d'état on 10 March 1952. The US provided military training, transport and fighter aircraft similar to those operated by the US military.

=== Early years under Castro ===
In 1959, when the Cuban Revolution overthrew the government of Fulgencio Batista, the new government led by Fidel Castro inherited most of the aircraft and equipment of the old regime. This was supplemented by the aircraft of the revolutionaries own Fuerza Aérea Rebelde, (Note: The Fuerza Aérea Rebelde consisted mainly of transports and light aircraft, which were used to carry arms and personnel to the rebel fighters, but also included three P-51 Mustang fighter aircraft and a T-28 armed trainer.) to form the new Fuerza Aérea Revolucionaria (FAR). Arrests of many of the personnel, including 40 pilots, of the old air force meant that the FAR was short of manpower to operate its aircraft. A lack of spare parts further reduced operational efficiency and a US-inspired arms embargo restricted efforts to acquire replacement aircraft.

In April 1961, CIA-backed Cuban exiles attempted an invasion of Cuba with the aim of overthrowing Castro's government. The invasion was preceded on 17 April by air attacks on Cuban airfields in an attempt to destroy the FAR prior to the invasion, with several FAR aircraft being destroyed. The remaining operational aircraft were deployed against the Cuban exiles landings on 19 April, sinking one transport, the Rio Escondido and badly damaging another, the Houston, which was beached, resulting in the loss of most of the invaders' supplies.

The Revolution and the Cuban Missile Crisis caused Cuba's legacy American aircraft to become worn out and fall into disuse. The Soviet Union came to the rescue and sent Cuba their first jet fighters, the MiG-15bis, MiG-15R and MiG-15UTI, and transport aircraft such as the An-2 and Il-14.

In 1969, the inadequacy of the radar coverage to the south of the United States were dramatically illustrated when a Cuban Air Force MiG-17 went undetected before it landed at Homestead Air Force Base, Florida. In 1971, a Cuban Antonov An-24 similarly arrived unannounced at New Orleans International Airport.

=== Later years ===
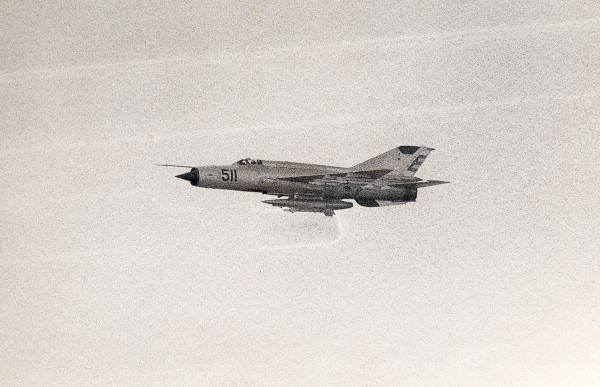
A Cuban MiG-21MF in the 1970s

In the 1980s, Cuba with the help of the Soviet Union was able to project power abroad, using its air force, especially in Africa. During that time Cuba sent jet fighters and transports for deployment in conflict zones such as Angola and Ethiopia.

In the late 1980s, Cuba implemented a plan to acquire 45 MiG-29 Fulcrum, including trainer versions, from the Soviet Union. With the collapse of the Soviet Union in 1991, this plan came to an end with only twelve MiG-29 (9.12B) fighter aircraft and two MiG-29UB (9.51) trainer aircraft being delivered.

In 1990, Cuba's Air Force was the best equipped in Latin America. During this time, the Cuban Air Force imported approximately 230 fixed-wing aircraft. Although there is no exact figure available, Western analysts estimate that at least 130, with only 25 operational), of these planes are still in service, spread out among the thirteen military airbases on the island.

In 1996, fighters from the DAAFAR shot down two Cessna aircraft based in Florida which were accused of dropping leaflets into Cuban airspace. The Air Force was criticized for not giving the pilots of the aircraft options other than being shot down. One aircraft escaped.

In 1998, according to the same DIA report mentioned above, the air force had "fewer than 24 operational MIG fighters; pilot training barely adequate to maintain proficiency; a declining number of fighter sorties, surface-to-air missiles and air-defense artillery to respond to attacking air forces."

== Organization ==
In 2007, the International Institute for Strategic Studies assessed the force as 8,000 strong, with 41 combat capable aircraft and a further 189 stored. DAAFAR is divided into three territorial commands known as air zones. In each air zone, there is a Brigade with several independent Regiments and Squadrons. Each regiment has about 30 aircraft. Squadrons can vary in number, but are usually 12-14 aircraft.

DAAFAR's air force, which it maintained until the 1980s, has now declined and its fighting power is now very limited. The fighter aircraft confirmed to be in operation are mainly the MiG-29 and MiG-21. Although Cuba once operated more than 50 MiG-23s, 3 of which were confirmed to be operational in 2011, they are not currently in operation. DAAFAR is assessed to have 12 operational transport and training aircraft, including the L-39C and helicopters, mainly Mil Mi-8, Mil Mi-17 and Mil Mi-24 Hind.

In 2010, Raul Castro ordered that all MiG-29 pilots undergo full training, and they now fly between 200 and 250 hours per year, in addition to actual dogfight training and exercises. Due to this limited training time, MiG-21 units spend more time in simulators and maintain their flying skills in the Air Force's civilian brand Aerogaviota. Up to 20 MiG-23 units, said to exist, also undergo this type of training, but it has not been revealed whether any of the aircraft are already operational, if a unit exists, or how many remain.

At San Antonio de los Baños military air field, south west of Havana, several aircraft are visible using Google Earth.

=== Air bases ===
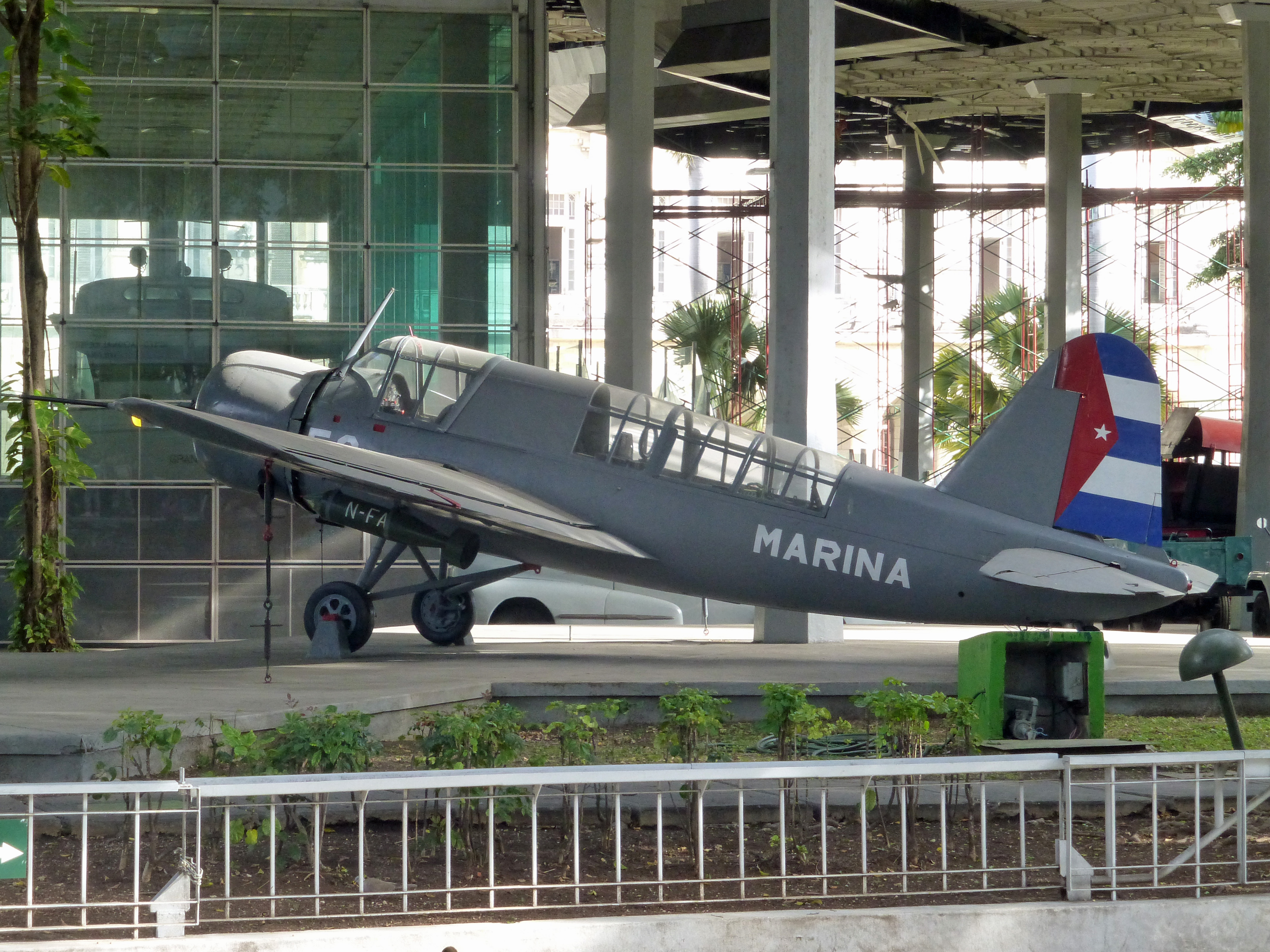
A Cuban Naval Vought OS2U-3

- San Julián Air Base
- San Antonio de los Baños Airfield
- La Coloma Airport
- Santa Clara Air Base
- Cienfuegos Air Base
- Holguín Air Base
- Santiago de Cuba Base
- Playa Baracoa Airbase

=== Units ===
- Western Air Zone - 2nd Guards Aviation Brigade "Battle of Girón Beach" (San Antonio de los Baños Airfield)
  - 21st Fighter Regiment, San Antonio (interception and air support)
    - 211th Fighter Squadron
    - 212th Fighter Squadron
  - 22nd Fighter Regiment, Baracoa (interception and air support)
    - 221st Fighter Squadron
    - 222nd Fighter Squadron
    - 223rd Fighter Squadron
  - 23rd Fighter Regiment, San Antonio and San Julián (interception and air support)
    - 231st San Antonio de los Baños Fighter Squadron
    - 232nd San Julián Fighter Squadron
  - 24th Tactical Support Regiment, Guines
    - 241st Fighter Squadron
  - 26th Helicopter Regiment, Ciudad Libertad
    - 261st General Purpose Helicopter Squadron
    - 262nd General Purpose Helicopter Squadron
  - 25th Transport Regiment, San Antonio and José Martí
    - 251st Transport Squadron, Jose Martí Airport
    - 252nd Transportation Squadron, San Antonio de los Baños
- "Comandante Che Guevara" Air Force Academy, San Julián
- Central Air Zone - 1st Guards Brigade "Battle of Santa Clara"
  - 11th Fighter Regiment, Santa Clara (interception and air support)
    - 111th Fighter Squadron
    - 112th Fighter Squadron
  - 12th Fighter Regiment, Sancti Spiritus (interception and air support)
    - 121st Fighter Squadron
    - 122nd Fighter Squadron
  - 14th Tactical Support Regiment, Santa Clara (fighter-bombers)
    - 141st Fighter Squadron
  - 16th Helicopter Regiment, Cienfuegos
    - 162nd Helicopter Squadron
    - 163rd Helicopter Squadron
  - Naval Aviation of the Revolutionary Navy, Cienfuegos
    - 161st Anti-Submarine Warfare Helicopter Squadron
  - 15th Transportation Regiment, Cienfuegos
    - 151st Transport Squadron
- Eastern Air Zone - 3rd Guards Aviation Brigade "Moncada Barracks"
  - 31st Fighter Regiment, Camagüey (interception and air support)
    - 311th Fighter Squadron
    - 312th Fighter Squadron
  - 34th Tactical Support Regiment, Holguín (fighter-bombers)
    - 341st Fighter Squadron
  - 36th Helicopter Regiment, Santiago de Cuba
    - 361st Combat Helicopter Squadron
    - 362nd Helicopter Squadron
    - 363rd Helicopter Squadron
  - 35th Transport Regiment, Santiago de Cuba
    - 351st Transport Squadron

==== 2nd Guards Aviation Brigade "Girón Beach" ====
The 2nd Guards "Playa Girón" Aviation Brigade, based in San Antonio de los Baños, is an elite unit of the DAAFAR. The San Antonio de los Baños air base was built at the end of World War II. In 1976, the unit stationed that received the current name of the Playa Girón Guards Aviation Brigade. In April 1961, was responsible for the defense of Cuba during the Bay of Pigs Invasion.

Among its notable members was Cuban cosmonaut Arnaldo Tamayo Méndez. It is a recipient of the Antonio Maceo Order, which was awarded to it in 2014 on its 55th anniversary. In October 2019, the regiment called for the immediate release of former Brazilian President and leader of the Workers Party, Luiz Inácio Lula da Silva.

== Aircraft ==
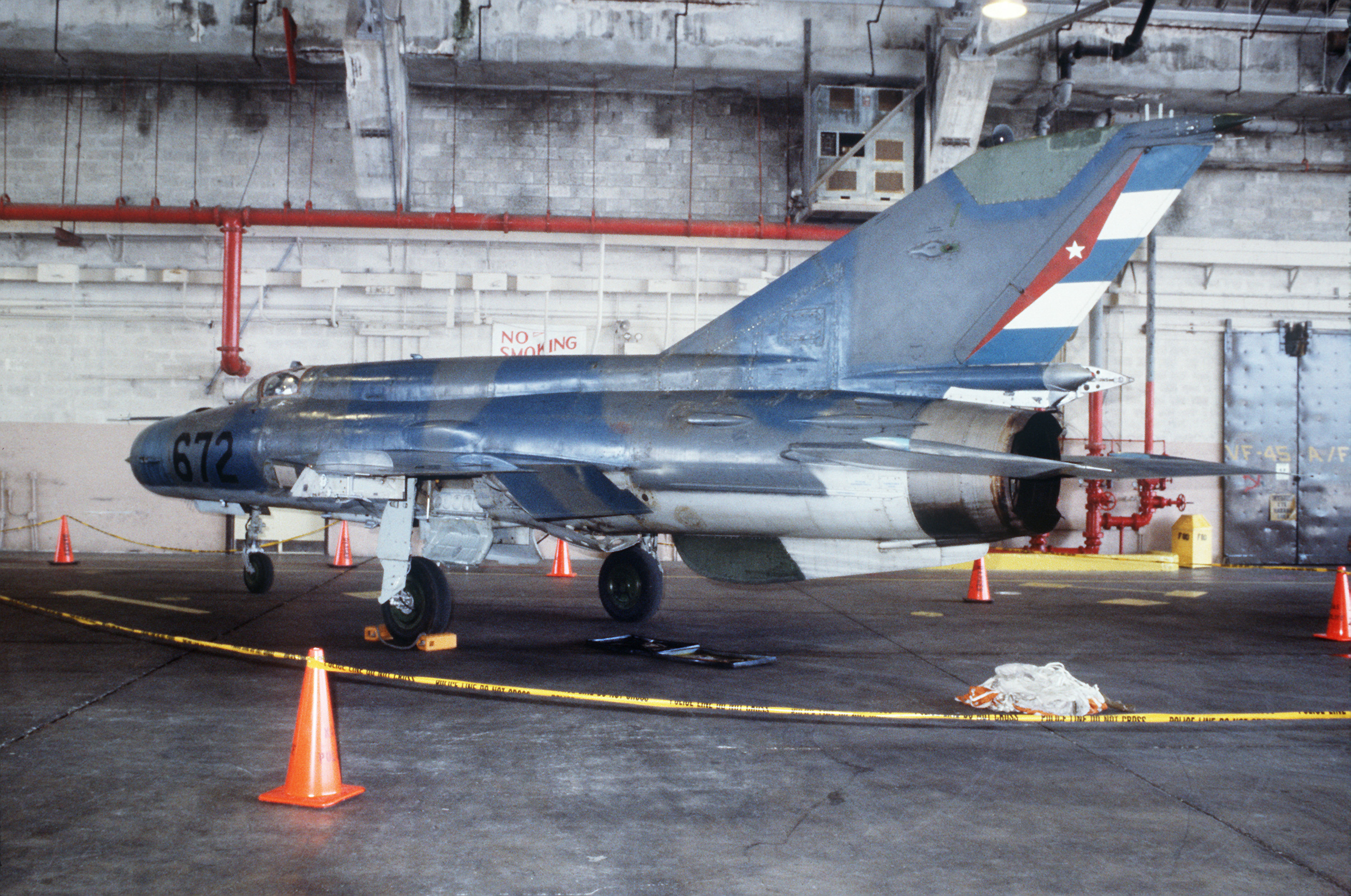
A Cuban MiG-21 fighter aircraft inside VF-45 hangar.

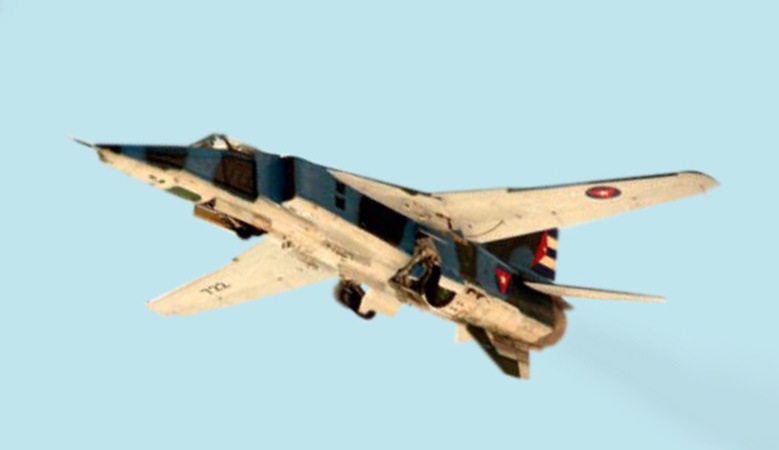
A Cuban MiG-23BN

=== Current inventory ===
Aircraft	Origin	Type	Variant	In service	Notes
Transport
Antonov An-24	Soviet Union	Transport		1	
Antonov An-26	Soviet Union	Transport		3	
Helicopters
Mil Mi-8	Soviet Union	Utility	P	2	
Mil Mi-17	Soviet Union	Utility		7	
Mil Mi-24	Russia	Attack	Mi-35	4	
Trainer aircraft
Aero L-39	Czechoslovakia	Jet trainer	C	3	

=== Retired ===
Prior to the Cuban Revolution, aircraft operated by the Air Force included: Vought O2U Corsair, Airco DH.4B, Curtiss JN-4D, Waco D-7, Bellanca Aircruiser, Howard Aircraft Corporation transports, Boeing-Stearman A73, Curtiss-Wright 19R-2, Grumman G-21 Goose, Aeronca L-3, Boeing-Stearman PT-13, Boeing-Stearman PT-17, North American T-6, North American P-51D Mustang, North American B-25J Mitchell, Douglas C-47, Lockheed T-33A, Hawker Sea Fury, de Havilland Canada DHC-2 Beaver fixed-wing aircraft, and Westland Whirlwind (S-55) helicopters.

Post-Cuban Revolution aircraft that was previously operated includes: MiG-15bis/R/UTI, MiG-17AS/F, MiG-19P, MiG-21F-13/PFM/MF/bis/U/R/UM, MiG-23MF/BN/ML/US/UM, MiG-29B 9.12B/UB 9.51, Antonov An-2, An-32, Ilyushin Il-14, Il-28, Il-62, Yakovlev Yak-40, and Zlin 226 fixed-wing aircraft plus Mil Mi-1, Mi-4A and Mi-14 helicopters.

== Bibliography ==
- Hagedorn, Daniel P. (1993). Central American and Caribbean Air Forces. Tonbridge, Kent, UK: Air-Britain (Historians) Ltd. ISBN 0-85130-210-6.
- Hagedorn, Daniel P. (September–October 1996). "Talkback". Air Enthusiast (65): 80. ISSN 0143-5450.
- Hudson, Rex A; Library of Congress, Federal Research Division (2002). Cuba : a country study. Washington, D.C.: Library of Congress : For sale by the Supt. of Docs., U.S. G.P.O, 2002. ISBN 0-8444-1045-4.
- de Quesada, Alejandro (2009). The Bay of Pigs: Cuba 1961. Elite series. Vol. 166. Oxford: Osprey Publishing Ltd. ISBN 978-1-84603-323-0.
- International Institute for Strategic Studies (11 February 2025). "Chapter Seven: Latin America and the Caribbean". The Military Balance. 125 (1). Taylor & Francis: 380–439. doi:10.1080/04597222.2025.2445479.
- Reinhard, Martin A. (January–February 2004). "Talkback". Air Enthusiast. No. 109. p. 74. ISSN 0143-5450.
- Wragg, David (2011). The World Air Power Guide. Casemate Publishers. ISBN 978-1-84468-784-8.
