= June 1941 =

Month of 1941

<<	June 1941					>>
Su	Mo	Tu	We	Th	Fr	Sa
1	2	3	4	5	6	7
8	9	10	11	12	13	14
15	16	17	18	19	20	21
22	23	24	25	26	27	28
29	30

The following events occurred in June 1941:

== June 1, 1941 (Sunday) ==
- The Battle of Crete ended in a Pyrrhic victory for the Axis.
- The light cruiser HMS Calcutta was sunk by the Luftwaffe off Alexandria, Egypt.
- In the power vacuum in Baghdad following the collapse of the Rashid Ali regime, two days of violence known as the Farhud broke out against the local Jewish population.
- Clothes rationing began in the United Kingdom.
- 110 German aircraft bombed Manchester.
- Catholic journals in Nazi Germany no longer receive printing paper.
- Born: Alexander V. Zakharov, astronomer, in Moscow, USSR
- Died: Hans Berger, 68, German psychiatrist (suicide); Jenny Dolly, 48, American dancer and actress, one-half of The Dolly Sisters identical twin performers; Hugh Walpole, 57, English novelist

== June 2, 1941 (Monday) ==
- Adolf Hitler and Benito Mussolini met at the Brenner Pass once again. During the five-hour conference Hitler ranted about Rudolf Hess and other recent events, but kept Mussolini in the dark about the upcoming invasion of the Soviet Union. However, major Italian troop movements in the Balkans around this time suggest that the Italian government was likely aware of Hitler's intentions anyway. Mussolini reportedly told Count Ciano after the meeting, "I wouldn't be at all sorry if Germany in her war with Russia got her feathers plucked."
- Manchester Blitz: German bombers attacked Manchester and neighbouring Salford, killing 70 and severely injuring 86.
- German submarine U-147 was sunk off Ireland by depth charges from British warships.
- The Massacre of Kondomari and the first Alikianos executions were carried by German paratroopers in reprisal for the active participation of Cretan civilians during the Battle of Crete.
- The British cargo ship Michael E was torpedoed and sunk in the North Atlantic by the German submarine U-108.
- 79-year old Chief Justice of the United States Charles Evans Hughes informed President Roosevelt that he was retiring effective July 1.
- Born: Stacy Keach, actor, in Savannah, Georgia; Charlie Watts, drummer for The Rolling Stones, in Kingsbury, London, England (d. 2021)
- Died: Lou Gehrig, 37, American baseball player (amyotrophic lateral sclerosis)

== June 3, 1941 (Tuesday) ==
- Razing of Kandanos: German occupying forces in Crete completely destroyed the village of Kandanos in retaliation for the resistance of the local population during the Battle of Crete.
- The Finnish High Command granted the German General Staff permission to use northern Finland as a staging area for the planned attack on the Soviet Union.
- Hitler received Japanese ambassador Hiroshi Ōshima at the Berghof and informed him of the plan to attack the Soviet Union.
- 48-year-old Mrs. Simon Olson of Moorhead, Minnesota, drowned in Avalanche Creek in Glacier National Park, Montana, after falling in while posing for a photograph on a log beside the creek.

== June 4, 1941 (Wednesday) ==
- British forces seized control of Mosul and set up a pro-British government.
- The Luftwaffe bombed Alexandria.
- British intelligence intercepted Ambassador Ōshima's coded message which included considerable details of Germany's plan to attack the USSR. However, due to a lack of either translators or interest, the report was not delivered to the Joint Intelligence Committee for eight days.
- The British ocean liner Zealandic struck a sunken wreck off Cromer while trying to evade a Luftwaffe attack and ran aground. Zealandic was then torpedoed by German E-boats before she could be salvaged.
- Died: Morris Michael Edelstein, 53, Polish-born American Congressional Representative; Wilhelm II, 82, Emperor of Germany from 1888 to 1918

== June 5, 1941 (Thursday) ==
- About 4,000 Chinese residents who hid in a tunnel during the Bombing of Chongqing died of asphyxiation.
- United States landed 4,000 marines in Iceland to replace the British garrison.
- Vichy French planes bombed the Transjordanian capital of Amman.
- From Alexandria the Greek Prime Minister-in-exile Emmanouil Tsouderos made a broadcast to the people of occupied Greece. "Unite as one man more closely than ever around our national symbols, around our flag and our heroic King," Tsouderos said. "Keep your heads high as men who have been victorious. Do not trust the enemy; and have confidence in the final victory. Help each one of you, with every means at your disposal in order that we may achieve the final victory. Help our country to overcome the present misfortunes until the glorious day of liberation of a Greece great and new."
- An explosion of stored ammunition at Smederevo Fortress in Yugoslavia killed about 2,500 people.
- Sandor Szabo won the National Wrestling Association World Heavyweight Championship over Bronko Nagurski in St. Louis by disqualification.
- German submarine U-573 was commissioned.
- Born: Martha Argerich, Argentinian-born Swiss pianist, in Buenos Aires; Spalding Gray, actor and writer, in Providence, Rhode Island (d. 2004)

== June 6, 1941 (Friday) ==
- President Roosevelt signed a bill authorizing the requisitioning of all foreign merchant ships idling in American ports. He then issued an executive order authorizing the Maritime Commission to operate or dispose of the ships in the interest of national defense. 84 vessels were affected by the order.
- German troops arrived in Finland.
- Commissar Order: Hitler ordered that commissars of the Red Army captured in battle or in resistance were "to be disposed of by gunshot immediately."
- President Roosevelt said during a press conference that many Americans were being duped by German propaganda into believing that Britain was on the verge of collapse and would soon be suing for peace.
- The 1941 Birthday Honours of King George VI were published.
- Died: Louis Chevrolet, 62, Swiss-born American race car driver and co-founder of the Chevrolet automobile company

== June 7, 1941 (Saturday) ==
- Japan diplomatically recognized the Independent State of Croatia.
- Operation Josephine B ended in Allied success when a sabotage team blew up an electrical transformer station in Pessac.
- Soviet Armaments Commissar Boris Vannikov was arrested.
- Whirlaway won the Belmont Stakes and completed the U.S. Triple Crown of Thoroughbred Racing.
- Craig Wood won the U.S. Open.
- German submarines U-85, U-207 and U-332 were commissioned.
- "My Sister and I" by Jimmy Dorsey and His Orchestra hit #1 on the Billboard singles charts.
- Born: Tony Ray-Jones, photographer, in Wells, Somerset, England (d. 1972)

== June 8, 1941 (Sunday) ==
- The Syria–Lebanon Campaign began with the Allied invasion of Vichy French-controlled Syria and Lebanon.
- The British cargo ship Kingston Hill was torpedoed and sunk southwest of Cape Verde by the German submarine U-38.
- Born: Robert Bradford, minister and politician, in Limavady, Northern Ireland (d. 1981); Fuzzy Haskins, R&B and funk musician (The Parliaments, P-Funk), in Elkins, West Virginia (d. 2023)

== June 9, 1941 (Monday) ==
- The Battle of the Litani River was fought in French Lebanon, resulting in Allied victory.
- President Roosevelt issued Executive Order 8773, authorizing the Secretary of War to take over the striking North American Aviation plant in Inglewood, California. The president explained in a statement that the work stoppage could not be allowed to continue because it had created a situation that was "seriously detrimental to the defense of the United States."
- Luftwaffe units began deploying near the Soviet border.
- Hitler issued Directive No. 31, German Military Organisation in the Balkans.
- The funeral of ex-kaiser Wilhelm II was held in Doorn. Although Hitler had wanted a state funeral in Berlin with himself in a prominent role, Wilhelm's family insisted on respecting instructions he'd given in 1933 that he was to be buried in Doorn if Germany was not a monarchy at the time of his death. However, a delegation of Nazi officials led by Arthur Seyss-Inquart was allowed to attend as well as a Wehrmacht guard of honour, and Wilhelm's wishes that Nazi regalia not be displayed at his funeral were ignored.
- Born: Jon Lord, composer and rock keyboardist for Deep Purple, in Leicester, England (d. 2012)

== June 10, 1941 (Tuesday) ==
- Vichy Vice-Premier François Darlan made a speech to the French people warning of those who were "trying to darken the nation's understanding." Darlan said that "de Gaullist and Communist propaganda" both had "the same goal - to create disorder in the country, to increase the misery of the population, to prevent the rebirth of the nation ... Frenchmen, beware and help the government in its heavy, very heavy task. This task of the government is triple: to ameliorate the French people's situation, to prepare for peace in that measure a conquered nation can, and to prepare France's future in a new Europe."
- On the first anniversary of Italy's entry into the war, Mussolini said in a speech to the Grand Council of Fascism that the United States was already in a de facto state of war with the Axis, but that "America's attitude does not bother us excessively ... American intervention would merely lengthen the war and would not save England."
- The British troops of 3rd battalion of 15th Punjab Regiment captured Assab in Ethiopia from Italian garrison by surprise (see Operation Chronometer).
- Born: Mickey Jones, musician and actor, in Houston, Texas (d. 2018); James A. Paul, writer and executive, in New York City; Jürgen Prochnow, actor, in Berlin, Germany

== June 11, 1941 (Wednesday) ==
- The Royal Air Force bombed the Ruhr and Rhineland for the first of 20 consecutive nights.
- The United States sent a note to Portugal reserving the right to act in self-defense should the Azores and Cape Verde Islands be threatened by belligerent powers.
- German submarine U-130 was commissioned.

== June 12, 1941 (Thursday) ==
- Representatives of fourteen Allied countries and governments-in-exile made a pact in London to fight until victory was won and not make separate peace treaties with any Axis countries.
- Hitler met with Romanian leader Ion Antonescu in Munich. An agreement was reached for Romania to participate in the invasion of the USSR.
- The British cargo ship Empire Dew was torpedoed and sunk north of the Azores by German submarine U-48.
- The German cruiser Lützow was torpedo bombed in the Trondheimsfjord by Bristol Beauforts of RAF Coastal Command and put out of action until 1942.
- President Roosevelt nominated Harlan F. Stone to be the 12th Chief Justice of the United States.
- German submarines U-574 and U-575 were commissioned.
- Born: Marv Albert, sportscaster, in Brooklyn, New York; Chick Corea, jazz pianist, in Chelsea, Massachusetts (d. 2021); Roy Harper, folk rock musician, in Rusholme, Manchester, England; Reg Presley, lead singer of The Troggs, in Andover, Hampshire, England (d. 2013)

== June 13, 1941 (Friday) ==
- The Battle of Jezzine was fought in French Lebanon, resulting in Australian victory.
- Vichy French President Philippe Pétain announced the arrest of 12,000 Jews for "plotting to hinder Franco-German co-operation."
- The comedy film Tom, Dick and Harry starring Ginger Rogers, George Murphy, Alan Marshal, Phil Silvers and Burgess Meredith was released.

== June 14, 1941 (Saturday) ==
- President Roosevelt issued Executive Order 8785, freezing all German and Italian assets in the United States.
- "Maria Elena" by Jimmy Dorsey and His Orchestra topped the Billboard singles charts.
- Independent State of Croatia joins Axis.
- Born: Mike Yarwood, British comedian and impressionist, in Bredbury, Cheshire (d. 2023)

== June 15, 1941 (Sunday) ==
- The British launched Operation Battleaxe, seeking to clear eastern Cyrenaica of German and Italian forces and lift the Siege of Tobruk.
- The Battle of Kissoué began in Syria.
- Born: Neal Adams, comic book artist, on Governors Island, Manhattan, New York (d. 2022); Harry Nilsson, singer-songwriter, in Brooklyn, New York (d. 1994)
- Died: Evelyn Underhill, 65, English Anglo-Catholic writer and pacifist

== June 16, 1941 (Monday) ==
- President Roosevelt ordered the closing of all German consulates in the United States and expulsion of their German employees no later than July 10, on the grounds of improper activities "inimical to the welfare of this country."
- Winston Churchill gave a radio speech from London accepting an honorary degree of Doctor of Laws from the University of Rochester in New York. Churchill told his American listeners that it gave him "comfort and inspiration to feel that I think as you do, that our hands are joined across the oceans, and that our pulses throb and beat as one ... A wonderful story is unfolding before our eyes. How it will end we are not allowed to know. But on both sides of the Atlantic we all feel, I repeat, all, that we are a part of it, that our future and that of many generations is at stake."

== June 17, 1941 (Tuesday) ==
- The British called off the failed Operation Battleaxe after taking 1,000 casualties and losing almost 100 tanks.
- The Battle of Kissoué ended in Allied victory.
- Hitler issued the final order for Operation Barbarossa to begin on June 22 at 3:00 a.m.
- Finland announced its withdrawal from the League of Nations.
- The United States District Court for the Western District of New York decided a case with a very unusual name: United States v. 11 1/4 Dozen Packages of Articles Labeled in Part Mrs. Moffat's Shoo-Fly Powders for Drunkenness.
- Born: Sanford Levinson, legal scholar, in Hendersonville, North Carolina

== June 18, 1941 (Wednesday) ==
- The Battle of Damascus began in Syria.
- The German–Turkish Treaty of Friendship was signed.
- German submarine U-138 was sunk off Cape Trafalgar, Spain by depth charges from British warships.
- German submarine U-753 was commissioned.
- Joe Louis retained the World Heavyweight Championship of boxing with a thirteenth-round knockout of Billy Conn at the Polo Grounds in New York City.
- Died: Thomas H. Rynning, 75, Norwegian-born American army officer and law enforcement official

== June 19, 1941 (Thursday) ==
- The Battle of Merdjayoun began in French Lebanon.
- Germany and Italy ordered the United States to close all 31 of its consulates in retaliation for President Roosevelt's order of three days earlier.
- The Kriegsmarine began mining the Baltic Sea.
- Born: Conchita Carpio-Morales, Ombudsman of the Philippines, in Paoay, Ilocos Norte, Commonwealth of the Philippines; Václav Klaus, 2nd President of the Czech Republic, in Prague, Protectorate of Bohemia and Moravia

== June 20, 1941 (Friday) ==
- President Roosevelt told Congress that the United States would not yield to such "outrageous and indefensible" acts as the sinking of the SS Robin Moor and said that Germany would be held accountable.
- The United States Army Air Forces were established.
- Germany first briefed Romania on the plan to invade the Soviet Union.
- Finland mobilized all reservists under age 45.
- The American submarine O-9 foundered during a test dive off Portsmouth, New Hampshire. All 33 crew were lost.
- Ford Motor Company signed its first contract with United Automobile Workers and Congress of Industrial Organizations.
- Berlin Diary by the American journalist William L. Shirer was published.
- The theatre strike in Norway was settled after a month.
- German submarine U-351 was commissioned.
- A Russian expedition in Samarkand opened the tomb of the Turco-Mongol conqueror Timur and discovered his embalmed body. Rumors circulated among the locals that opening the tomb would bring a curse.
- The comedy film The Big Store starring the Marx Brothers was released.

== June 21, 1941 (Saturday) ==
- The Battle of Damascus ended in Allied victory.
- Hitler sent Benito Mussolini a secret message informing him of the German invasion of the Soviet Union. "I waited until this moment, Duce, to send you this information, it is because the final decision itself will not be made until 7 o'clock tonight," Hitler wrote. "I earnestly beg you, therefore, to refrain, above all, from making any explanation to your Ambassador at Moscow, for there is no absolute guarantee that our coded reports cannot be decoded. I, too, shall wait until the last moment to have my own Ambassador informed of the decisions reached."
- A law in Vichy France limited Jews to only 3 percent of university students.
- Churchill decided to dismiss Archibald Wavell as Commander-in-Chief, Middle East and replace him with Claude Auchinleck. Wavell took Auchinleck's old post of Commander-in-Chief, India.
- Peter II of Yugoslavia arrived in exile in London.
- The United States completed the tit-for-tat exchange of consulate closings with Germany and Italy by ordering all Italian consulates to close before July 15.
- The British steam collier Gasfire struck a mine in the North Sea and sank. All 26 crew were rescued.
- German submarines U-374, U-434, U-455 and U-456 were commissioned.
- "Daddy" by Sammy Kaye and His Orchestra hit #1 on the Billboard singles charts.
- Born: Joe Flaherty, actor and comedian, in Pittsburgh, Pennsylvania (d. 2024); Valeri Zolotukhin, theatrical and cinema actor, in Altai Krai, USSR (d. 2013)
- Died: Elliott Dexter, 71, American film and stage actor

== June 22, 1941 (Sunday) ==
- German forces launched Operation Barbarossa, the Axis invasion of the Soviet Union. A German declaration of war was presented to Soviet ambassador Vladimir Dekanozov in Berlin and by German ambassador Friedrich-Werner Graf von der Schulenburg to Soviet Foreign Minister Vyacheslav Molotov in Moscow. At around 3:25 a.m., Georgy Zhukov woke up Joseph Stalin by phone to inform him of the invasion, but Stalin had already made preparations to resist.
- The Defense of Brest Fortress, Battle of Hanko and Battle of Białystok–Minsk began on the Eastern Front.
- The Germans executed Operation Renntier to secure the nickel mines around Petsamo in Finland.
- The June Uprising in Lithuania began when a segment of the Lithuanian population rose up and declared the restoration of the country's independence.
- Hitler issued a lengthy proclamation of war with the Soviet Union presenting his justification for the German invasion. Hitler presented himself as doing everything he could to preserve peace and only turning to force as a last resort.
- Italy and Romania also declared war on the Soviet Union.
- Vyacheslav Molotov gave a broadcast authorized by Stalin to the citizens of the Soviet Union. "This war has been forced upon us, not by the German people, not by German workers, peasants and intellectuals, whose sufferings we well understand, but by the clique of bloodthirsty Fascist rulers of Germany who have enslaved Frenchmen, Czechs, Poles, Serbians, Norway, Belgium, Denmark, Holland, Greece and other nations," Molotov said. "The government of the Soviet Union expresses its unshakable confidence that our valiant army and navy and brave falcons of the Soviet Air Force will acquit themselves with honor in performing their duty to the fatherland and to the Soviet people, and will inflict a crushing blow upon the aggressor."
- Winston Churchill gave a speech announcing the German invasion of the Soviet Union and explaining Britain's new alliance with Russia. "No one has been a more consistent opponent of Communism than I have for the last twenty-five years," Churchill said. "I will unsay no word that I have spoken about it. But all this fades away before the spectacle which is now unfolding ... Any man or state who fights on against Nazidom will have our aid. Any man or state who marches with Hitler is our foe ... It follows, therefore, that we shall give whatever help we can to Russia and the Russian people. We shall appeal to all our friends and allies in every part of the world to take the same course and pursue it, as we shall, faithfully and steadfastly to the end."
- Born: Ed Bradley, broadcast journalist, in Philadelphia, Pennsylvania (d. 2006); Michael Lerner, actor, in Brooklyn, New York (d. 2023); Terttu Savola, politician, in Vimpeli, Finland.

== June 23, 1941 (Monday) ==
- The Battles of Brody and Raseiniai began on the Eastern Front.
- Stavka was created.
- Slovakia declared war on the Soviet Union.
- The Provisional Government of Lithuania was announced with the goal of establishing an independent Lithuania.
- The June 1941 uprising in eastern Herzegovina began when Serbs in eastern Herzegovina rebelled against the authorities of the Independent State of Croatia.
- Born: Robert Hunter, poet, singer and songwriter, in San Luis Obispo, California (d. 2019)
- Died: Frederick Gottwald, 82, American painter

== June 24, 1941 (Tuesday) ==
- Hitler arrives at the Wolf's Lair for the first time.
- The Battle of Merdjayoun ended in Allied victory.
- German troops captured the Baltic cities of Kaunas and Vilnius.
- British cargo ship Brockley Hill was torpedoed and sunk off Cape Farewell, Greenland by German submarine U-651.
- President Roosevelt said at a press conference, "Of course we are going to give all the aid we possibly can to Russia."
- Born: Erkin Koray, singer-songwriter, in Kadıköy, Istanbul, Turkey (d. 2023); Charles Whitman, mass murderer, in Lake Worth, Florida (d. 1966)

== June 25, 1941 (Wednesday) ==
- Finland declared war on the Soviet Union. The Continuation War began.
- German forces on the Eastern Front occupied Dubno and Lutsk in the south and Baranovichi in the north.
- The Soviet 13th Army withdrew from Maladzyechna.
- Beginning of the Kaunas pogrom, a five-day massacre of Lithuanian Jews by local partisans and invading German forces.
- U.S. President Roosevelt signed Executive Order 8802, prohibiting racial discrimination in the national defense industry. Roosevelt also created the Fair Employment Practice Committee to implement it.
- German submarine U-403 was commissioned.
- Died: Stepan Skitalets, 71, Russian poet, in Moscow

== June 26, 1941 (Thursday) ==
- German forces captured Daugavpils.
- Bombing of Kassa: Unidentified aircraft attacked the Hungarian city of Kassa. This attack became the pretext for Hungary to declare war on the Soviet Union the following day.
- Francoist Spain began to officially organize a unit of volunteers to fight alongside the Axis on the Eastern Front.
- A powerful earthquake struck the Andaman Islands in the Bay of Bengal.
- The cargo ship Mareeba was shelled and sunk in the Bay of Bengal by the German auxiliary cruiser Kormoran.
- German submarines U-453 and U-576 were commissioned.
- The Technicolor drama film Blossoms in the Dust starring Greer Garson and Walter Pidgeon premiered at Radio City Music Hall in New York City.

== June 27, 1941 (Friday) ==
- The Battle of Raseiniai ended in German victory.
- Hungary declared war on the Soviet Union.
- Cargo ship Empire Ability from convoy SL 78 was torpedoed and sunk by the German submarine U-69.
- German submarine U-556 was depth charged and sunk in the North Atlantic by British corvettes.
- Cargo ship Empire Activity was torpedoed off Newfoundland by German submarine U-96.
- Dutch cargo liner Maasdam was torpedoed and sunk off Greenland by German submarine U-564.
- Born: Krzysztof Kieślowski, film director, in Warsaw, General Government (d. 1996)

== June 28, 1941 (Saturday) ==
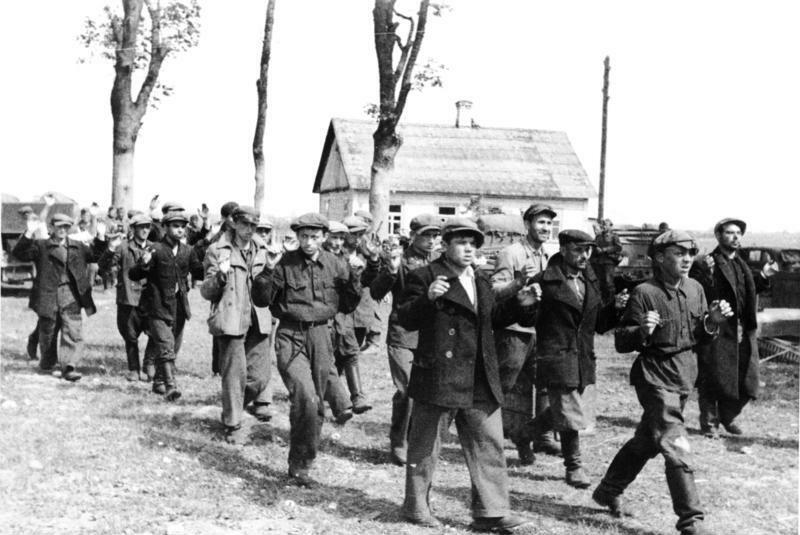
"Too bad even for a bullet... The Jews shown here were shot at once." 28 June 1941

- German forces captured Minsk in Belarus and Rovno in Ukraine.
- Albania declared war on the Soviet Union.
- North Atlantic weather war: The German weather ship Lauenburg was intercepted by British warships north of Iceland. A boarding party from the destroyer HMS Tartar seized a large amount of material that would be useful in cracking German codes, and then the Lauenburg was sunk by gunfire.
- President Roosevelt signed Executive Order 8807, creating the Office of Scientific Research and Development.
- The U.S. Senate confirmed the nomination of Harlan F. Stone to be Chief Justice of the United States.
- Born: Joseph Goguen, computer scientist, in the United States (d. 2006); David Johnston, 28th Governor General of Canada, in Greater Sudbury, Ontario, Canada

== June 29, 1941 (Sunday) ==
- The Defense of Brest Fortress ended in German victory.
- The Germans and Finns launched Operations Silver Fox and Platinum Fox, aimed at capturing the key Soviet port of Murmansk.
- 212,000 children were evacuated from Leningrad.
- Hitler issued a secret decree formally designating Hermann Göring as his successor. This is the decree that was referred to in the Göring telegram of April 1945.
- Germans capture the port city of Libau in Latvia.
- German submarine U-651 was depth charged and sunk in the North Atlantic by British warships.
- Died: Ignacy Jan Paderewski, 80, Polish pianist

== June 30, 1941 (Monday) ==
- The Battle of Brody ended in German victory.
- German forces captured Lvov.
- The Organization of Ukrainian Nationalists announced the Declaration of Ukrainian State Act and declared the Ukrainian National Government.
- Vichy France severed diplomatic relations with the Soviet Union.
- The Soviet Union created the State Defense Committee.
- Born: Otto Sander, actor, in Hanover, Germany (d. 2013)
