= VPB-145 =

Patrol Bombing Squadron 145
- Active: 15 July 1943 – 18 June 1945
- Country: United States of America
- Branch: United States Navy
- Type: squadron
- Role: Maritime patrol
- Engagements: World War II

Aircraft flown
- Patrol: PV-1

VPB-145 was a Patrol Bombing Squadron of the U.S. Navy. The squadron was established as Bombing Squadron 145 (VB-145) on 15 July 1943, redesignated Patrol Bombing Squadron 145 (VPB-145) on 1 October 1944 and disestablished on 18 June 1945.

== Operational history ==
- 15 July – 14 August 1943: VB-145 was established at NAS DeLand, Florida, under the operational control of FAW-12, as a medium bombing squadron flying the PV-1 Ventura. The majority of pilots assigned had never flown a twin-engine aircraft. Fortunately, nearly all of the enlisted personnel came from HEDRON-12 and were familiar with the idiosyncrasies of the Ventura airframe. On 29 July, Lieutenant (jg) J. L. Broady crashed on the runway at NAS DeLand during a training flight, killing himself, his copilot and one passenger. The crash served to emphasize the importance of wearing full flight clothing despite the heat. The pilot and passenger had been able to exit the burning aircraft, but had earlier stripped to the waist due to the heat in the cockpit. Both died from severe burns 12 hours after the crash. General ground training and familiarization flight training in the Venturas continued through 14 August when the squadron was sent to NAAF Boca Chica, Florida, for advanced Anti-submarine warfare (ASW) training and shakedown.
- 16 September 1943: VB-145 deployed to NAF Natal, Brazil, under the operational control of FAW-16. Routine patrols, convoy coverage and ASW missions were assigned to the squadron over the offshore waters of the Caribbean convoy lanes. Patrols were coordinated with VB-107, a PB4Y-1 Liberator squadron assigned to NAF Natal. Shortly after arrival, the squadron sent its aircraft, two or three at a time, to NAF Recife, Brazil, where the fleet air wing had its principal maintenance facilities. The aircraft were stripped of all unnecessary gear; armor plate was repositioned from the back to the bottom of the aircraft to protect against U-boat anti-aircraft (AA) fire; bomb bays were equipped to carry six 350-pound bombs and dorsal turrets were locked in the forward-firing position to supplement the nose guns when attacking surfaced submarines.
- 1 November 1943: A detachment of aircraft was sent to NAF Fernando de Noronha, 209 miles (336 km) northeast of Natal, Brazil, for barrier sweeps. Aircraft did not remain on the island throughout the deployment, only when intelligence indicated that a submarine might be making a transit homeward.
- 13 November 1943: Lieutenant E. M. Jones and his crew were forced to ditch at sea after their radio compass failed. Jones had taken the wrong bearing until too much fuel had been consumed to make landfall. After the squadron searched the area for six days, hope was given up of finding the crew. Finally, on the seventh day, the crew drifted ashore and was saved.
- 21 June 1944: VB-145 aircraft were sent to NAF Recife for retrofitting with HVAR rocket launching rails. Rocket training was then undertaken by all flight crews at NAF Maceio, Brazil, firing live projectiles at offshore targets.
- 27 August 1944: Lieutenant (jg) C. W. Bleicher and his crew were returning from a patrol and lost their bearings while en route to base due to radio compass failure. With only a few minutes of fuel left, the pilot set the Ventura down in shallow water off the beach approximately 70 miles (110 km) south of Fortaleza, Brazil. Only one crew member was injured in the crash and all exited the aircraft safely. An Army B-25 spotted the wreckage 10 minutes later and the crew was eventually rescued.
- 5–14 September 1944: A four-aircraft detachment was sent to RAF Ascension Island. The Venturas had been specially equipped with bomb bay tanks to extend their range on patrols.
- 5 December 1944: A three-aircraft detachment was sent to NAF Aratu, Bahia, Brazil. It returned to NAF Natal on 23 January 1945.
- 1 February 1945: VPB-145 was relieved at NAF Natal by VPB-126 and sent to NAF San Julián, Cuba. The squadron remained in Cuba through 28 February, conducting channel patrols and convoy coverage.
- 2 March 1945: VPB-145 was relieved and returned to NAS New York, New York, arriving there on 9 March 1945. The squadron had no sooner arrived than orders were received to proceed to NAS Brunswick, Maine, under the operational control of FAW-9. There the squadron was assigned patrols over the northern convoy lanes.
- 24 March 1945: Lieutenant Jack R. Kreigh and his crew made a crash landing at the end of the runway at NAS Brunswick, after completely running out of fuel after getting lost on their first operational patrol. The aircraft was demolished after hitting several tree stumps, but the crew survived with only minor injuries.
- 1–18 June 1945: All squadron operations were suspended upon receiving word that VPB-145 was to be disestablished. From 9 to 14 June, squadron aircrews ferried the squadron's aircraft to NAS Clinton, Oklahoma, for storage. On 18 June, VPB-145 was disestablished at NAS Quonset Point, Rhode Island.

== Aircraft assignments ==
The squadron was assigned the following aircraft, effective on the dates shown:

- PV-1 - August 1944

== Home port assignments ==
The squadron was assigned to these home ports, effective on the dates shown:

- NAS DeLand, Florida - 15 July 1943
- NAAF Boca Chica, Florida - 14 August 1943
- NAF Natal, Brazil - 16 September 1943
- NAF San Julián, Cuba - 1 February 1945
- NAS Brunswick, Maine - 9 March 1945
- NAS Quonset Point, Rhode Island - 1 June 1945

== See also ==
- Maritime patrol aircraft
- List of inactive United States Navy aircraft squadrons
- List of United States Navy aircraft squadrons
- List of squadrons in the Dictionary of American Naval Aviation Squadrons
- History of the United States Navy
