= San Antonio de los Baños Airfield =

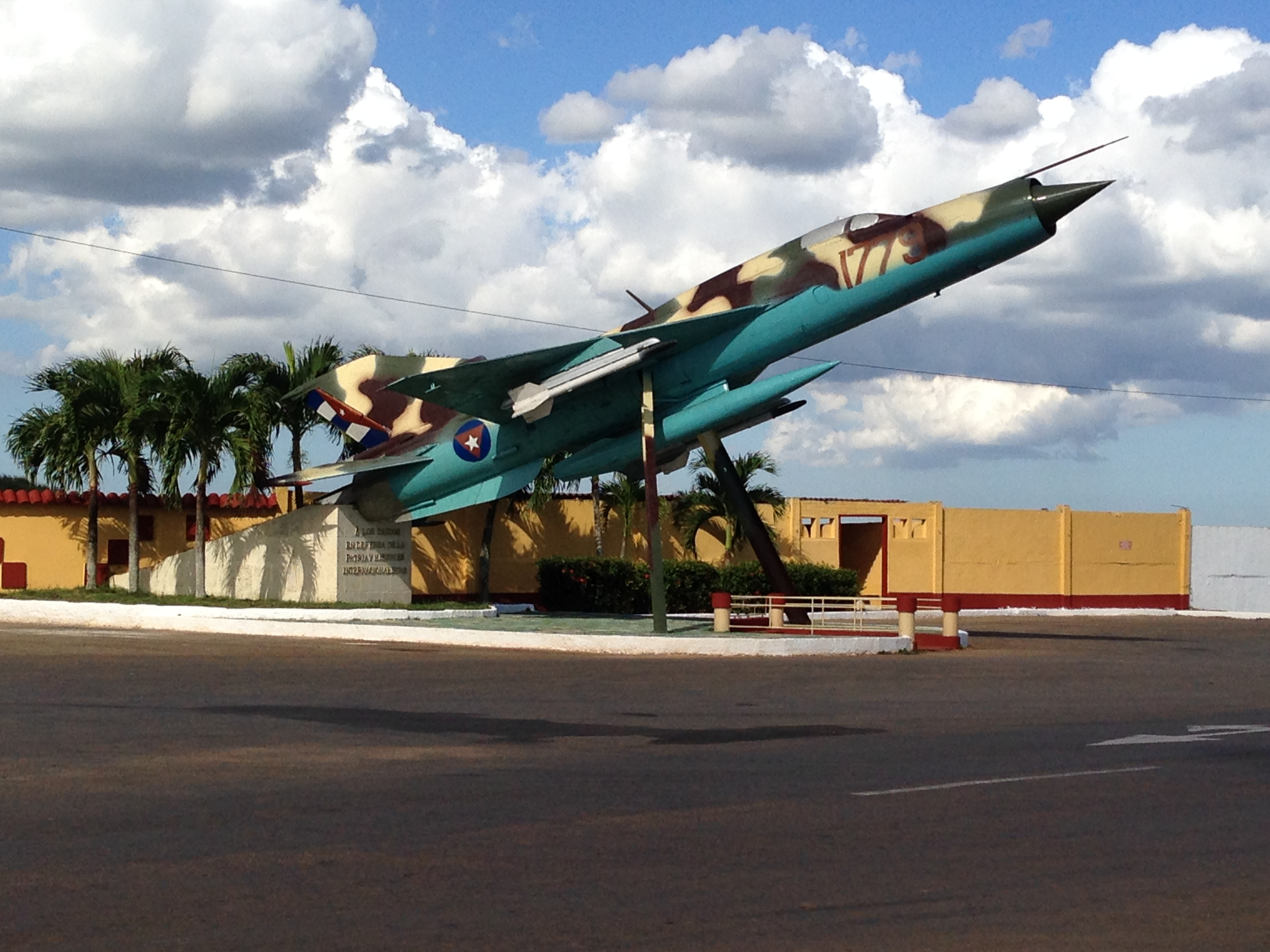
- IATA: none; ICAO: MUSA

Summary
- Airport type: Military
- Location: San Antonio de los Baños, Cuba
- Elevation AMSL: 50 m / 164 ft
- Coordinates: 22°52′18″N 082°30′34″W

Map
- Location in Cuba

Runways
Direction	Length		Surface
Direction	m	ft	Surface
05/23	3,596	11,798	Concrete
12/30	2,482	8,143	Concrete
01/19	2,400	7,874	Concrete
- Source: DAFIF

San Antonio de los Baños Airfield (ICAO: MUSA) is a military air base located near San Antonio de los Baños, a municipality in the province of Havana (La Habana) in Cuba. It is located approximately 3 mi (4.8 km) southwest of the city of San Antonio de los Baños, about 30 mi (48 km) southwest of Havana.

== History ==
=== World War II ===
The station was built in 1942 and was first used by American forces on 29 August 1942. The U.S. forces called it "Cayuga" (named after the construction company hired by the U.S. to build it - the Cayuga construction company is named after the upstate New York Native American tribe by the same name). The first United States Army Air Forces aircraft arrived at the airfield on 16 October. It was used for antisubmarine patrols and as a training airfield for B-29 Superfortress aircrews who flew training missions from airfields in Nebraska and Kansas to the field.

On September 9, 1942, Cuba and United States signed a new naval and Military Agreement of Cooperation for a second airfield that would later be known as San Julián Air Base. The Pinar del Río area was considered ideally situated for further development and the Army began construction by expanding an existing Pan American World Airways emergency landing airfield on 1 November 1942. When construction was completed on 1 July 1943, the new facility was re-designated Naval Air Facility (NAF) San Julian.

On November 1, 1942, the United States Army Air Forces set up postal operations for San Antonio de los Baños, using Army Post Office, Miami with the address: 632 APO MIA.

From 1943 to 1945, major units assigned were:

- 15th Antisubmarine Squadron (26th Antisubmarine Wing), 25 July-1 October 1943 (B-34 Ventura)
- 23d Antisubmarine Squadron (26th Antisubmarine Wing), 28 February-24 April 1943 (A-29 Hudson)
- 417th Bombardment Squadron (25th Bombardment Group), 13 April 1943-August 1943 (B-18 Bolo)
- 314th Bombardment Wing (28 February-24 April 1945 (B-29 Superfortress)
- Detachment: 89th Combat Crew Training Wing, 1943–1945

Numerous B-17, B-24 and B-29 group air echelons deployed for training from 1943 through 1945

=== Post-World War II ===
With the end of the war, the United States withdrew its forces from the airfield and it was turned over to the Cuban government on 30 April 1946.

After the handover, it was used by the Cuban Air Force. It was known as the Batista AAF (1953–1959). In a 1962 briefing paper on the Cuban Missile Crisis prepared by officials at the United States Department of Defense, the base was identified as "the headquarters for the Cuban Revolutionary Air Force and the assembly point for all MiGs, except the MIG-21, which [had] previously been received in Cuba."

During the Cuban Missile Crisis, Soviet Armed Forces elements deployed as part of Operation Anadyr were based at the airfield. The 32nd Guards Fighter Aviation Regiment of the Soviet Air Forces, flying MiG-21F-13s, had elements there. Initially, the regiment sent its 2nd Squadron from Santa Clara Air Base to San Antonio de los Baños, and then later the whole regiment was concentrated at San Antonio de los Baños. In 1963, the regiment transferred its aircraft to the Cuban Air Force and returned home. In Cuba, the regiment served under the title 213th Fighter Aviation Regiment.

== Elevation / Runways ==
The air base resides at an elevation of 50 m (160 ft) above mean sea level. It has three concrete paved runways: runway 05/23 is 3,596 by 56 metres (11,798 ft × 184 ft), runway 12/30 is 2,482 by 46 metres (8,143 ft × 151 ft), and runway 01/19 is 2,400 m × 46 m (7,874 ft × 151 ft).

== San Antonio de los Baños Air Base ==
The airport is an active Cuban Revolutionary Armed Forces airbase:

- UM 1779th Regiment
- UM 2661 Squadron- Mikoyan MiG-29A and UB, Mikoyan-Gurevich MiG-23ML and UB fighters
- UM 5010 Intercept Squadron - Mikoyan-Gurevich MiG-21BIS fighters and Mikoyan-Gurevich MiG-21UM fighter trainers
