= SS Albania (1920) =

British/Italian ship

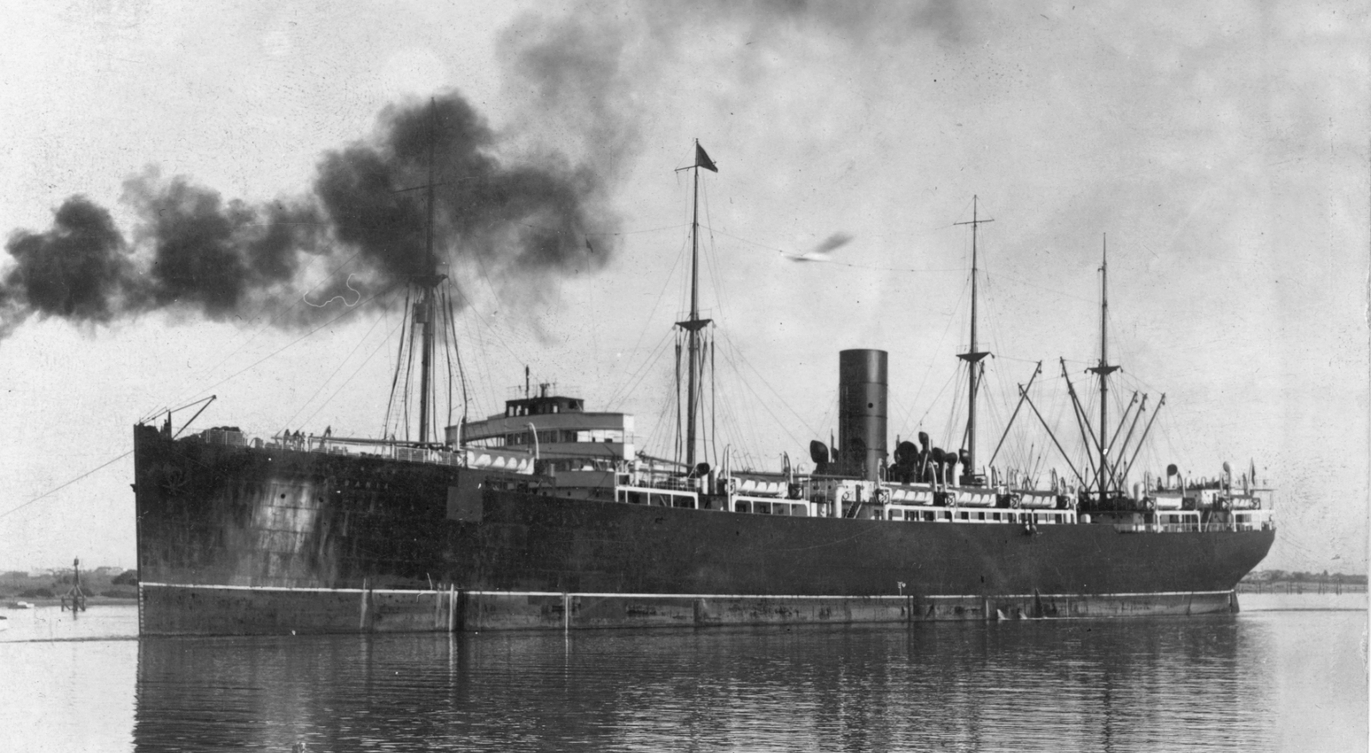
- SS Albania

History

United Kingdom
- Name: Albania
- Owner: Cunard Line
- Operator: Cunard Line
- Port of registry: Liverpool
- Route: 1921-1922 Liverpool – New York; 1922–1925 Liverpool – Quebec – Montreal
- Builder: Scotts Shipbuilding and Engineering Company Ltd. Greenock
- Yard number: 479
- Laid down: 1914
- Launched: 17 April 1920
- Completed: December 1920
- Maiden voyage: 18 January 1921
- Out of service: 1925
- Identification: British O.N.143704
- Fate: Sold 1930

History

Italy
- Name: California
- Owner: 1930–1937 Navigazione Liberia Triestina; 1937–1941 Lloyd Triestino S.A. di Navigazione
- Port of registry: Trieste
- Acquired: 1930
- Fate: Sunk 11 August 1941

General characteristics
- Type: Cargo liner
- Tonnage: 12768
- Length: 539 ft (164 m)
- Beam: 64 ft (20 m)
- Depth: 47 ft (14 m)
- Decks: 2
- Installed power: Four steam turbines double reduction geared
- Propulsion: Twin screw
- Speed: 15 knots (28 km/h; 17 mph)
- Capacity: 80 Cabin class passengers

SS Albania was a cargo liner laid down in 1914 by Scotts Shipbuilding and Engineering Company Ltd. Greenock, Scotland for the Cunard Line. Owing to the First World War, she wasn't completed until 1920. Designed to maximize cargo capacity, passenger accommodations were limited to the shelter and "tween" decks. Originally intended for the Liverpool–New York run, she was transferred in April of 1922 to the Canadian route. Ultimately the vessel proved a disappointment for Cunard, being too small to operate effectively as a passenger liner and too big for a freighter, and was laid up in 1925 until purchased in 1930 by the Italian company Liberia Triestina who renamed her SS California. She was converted for use as a hospital ship in 1935.

== Loss ==
On 11 August 1941, California was torpedoed and sunk off Syracuse by a Fairey Swordfish aircraft of 830 Squadron, Fleet Air Arm, operating out of Malta.

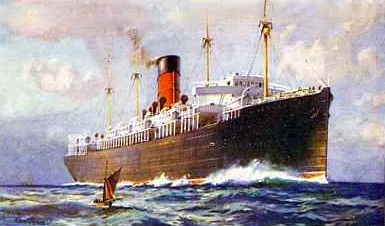
Postcard of the Albania
