= San Julián Air Base =

San Julián Air Base Base Aérea San Julián
- IATA: SNJ; ICAO: MUSJ

Summary
- Airport type: Military
- Location: Pinar del Río Province, Cuba
- Elevation AMSL: 30 m / 98 ft
- Coordinates: 22°05′43″N 084°09′07″W

Map
- Location in Cuba

Runways
Direction	Length		Surface
Direction	m	ft	Surface
01/19	2,041	6,696	Concrete
08/26	2,584	8,478	Concrete
- Source: DAFIF.

San Julián Air Base or Base Aérea San Julián (IATA: SNJ, ICAO: MUSJ) is a military air base located approximately 8 mi (13 km) southwest of the city of Guane a municipality in the province of Pinar del Río in Cuba. The provincial capital, Pinar del Río is located to the northeast approximately 36 mi (58 km) with the capital of Havana also to the northeast 134 mi (216 km).

== Tenant commands ==
The 23.Regimiento de Caza operating Russian Mig-23ML aircraft

== History of San Julián ==
On December 9, 1941, Cuba declared war on the Empire of Japan.

On December 11, 1941, Cuba and the United States of America, Costa Rica, The Dominican Republic, Guatemala and Nicaragua declare war on Nazi Germany and Fascist Italy.

On January 14, 1942, the Cuban Secretary of State (José Manuel Cortina) indicates in a diplomatic message to the American Chargé in Cuba (Ellis O. Briggs) the following "I take pleasure in advising you that the Government of Cuba, inspired by the lofty sentiments of cooperation and alliance which joins the Cuban Nation with the United States of America in the present war, engaged in the territorial defense of America and of every one of the American nations, as well as of the principles of democracy and of the liberty of the peoples, has accepted the suggestions of your Government which were transmitted by the Embassy in the above-mentioned notes." The above-mentioned notes were two and included 5 specific points of suggestion including in part: Stationing of US Aviation Corps Detachments in certain airfields (i.e. La Fé, in the Province of Pinar del Río; Rancho Boyeros, in the Province of Habana; and in Camagüey); Permission to use Cuban landing fields; Permission to take photographs of Cuban territory for aerial navigation charts, etc.

On June 18, the United States established Naval Air Facility (NAF) La Fé, Cuba. The US NAVY Code Word for La Fé was HUMPBACK. U.S. Navy bases in Cuba fell under the command of the Gulf Sea Frontier headquartered at Miami, Florida (after a brief stint based at Key West).

June 26, the United States established Naval Air Auxiliary Station (NAAS) (Lighter-than-Air), San Julián, Cuba. This was in response to Nazi Germany announcing unrestricted submarine warfare off the Atlantic Coast of the United States. Specifically, the United States Navy recognized the need to augment antisubmarine patrols in the Yucatán Channel. NAAS San Julián was established on the western tip of Cuba near Pan American World Airways' Isabel Rubio Emergency Landing Field.

August 6, in Havana, Cuba the U.S. Secretary for State announced that negotiations had been conducted between Cuba and the United States for the establishment of the air base in San Julián, Pinar del Río Province.

September 7, Cuba and United States sign a new Naval and Military Agreement of Cooperation. The strategic importance of Cuba for the air and maritime communications of United States and the importance of its production of sugar obliged them to reinforce the island. The Pinar del Río area was considered ideally situated for further development and the Army began construction by expanding the existing Pan American airfield on November 1.

A second air base was negotiated between Cuba and the United States and known as San Antonio de los Baños Airfield. The air base was also known as the Cayuga was built near a town of the same name in the Havana Province, by the United States Army Corps of Engineers (USACE) and the San Julián Air Base in the Guanahacabibes peninsula in Pinar del Río was also built. The United States flew patrols in the Caribbean and Gulf of Mexico to hunt German submarines (U-boats). The USAAF flew out of San Antonio de los Baños and the US NAVY used San Julián.

September 22, the USAAF began to organize the Army Air Forces Antisubmarine Command (AAFAC), using the I Bomber Command as its core for personnel and aircraft. The USAAF had been engaged in anti-submarine war for almost a year. During that time it had laid the basis for an effective organization and made plans for a larger anti-submarine force. The new AAFAC was constituted on October 13 and activated on October 15, 1942. Simultaneously, I Bomber Command was inactivated the same day.

The principal mission of AAFAC was to be "the location and destruction of hostile submarines wherever they may be operating". As a necessary means to this end it had the secondary mission of training crews and developing devices and techniques. The command was to be a direct reporting agency to the Commanding General, United States Army Air Forces, although its operations on the US NAVY Eastern and Gulf Sea Frontiers were to be conducted under the tactical control of US NAVY officials. The former I Bomber Command furnished the personnel, aircraft, and equipment for the new organization.

November 20, AAFAC had organized the squadrons it had inherited from I Bomber Command into the 25th and 26th anti-submarine Wings with headquarters at New York and Miami respectively.

=== 1943 ===
January 1, the United States Army Air Forces (USAAF) set up postal operations for San Julián using a non-descript number. They used Army Post Office, Miami with the address: 2754 APO MIA. Although the facility was under USAAF administration and operational control all air activities and operations were US Navy.

April 1, USAAF transferred control of NAAS San Julián to the Navy. The first Commander of the base was Lieutenant Commander Beckwith Havens, USN. The US NAVY likewise used a non-descript number for postal operations. They used Fleet Post Office, Atlantic located in New York City with the address: 301 FPO NY

July 1, construction was completed and the new facility was re-designated Naval Air Facility (NAF) San Julián.

The US Navy's Airship Squadron Twenty One (ZP-21) established a number of detachments at advance bases to provide ASW, rescue, escort and utility services in its area of operations, i.e. CARIB (Caribbean). These detachments were maintained throughout the war and located at: NAF San Julián; Santa Fe, Isle of Pines, Cuba; NAS Banana River, Fla.; Meacham Satellite Naval Air Field, Key West, Fla.; NAS Houma, La.; NAS San Juan, Puerto Rico; NAS Guantanamo Bay, Cuba; and La Chorrera Army Airfield, Panama.

October 1, the US Navy's Bombing Squadron One Hundred Twenty Five (VB-125) sent a three-aircraft detachment to NAF San Julián for ASW patrols.

=== 1944 ===
May 1, VB-125 transferred from Boca Chica, Florida, to NAF San Julián, joining the detachment sent there previously. The squadron was under the operational control of Fleet Airship Wing Twelve (FAW-12) and stayed in San Julián until February 11, 1945 when they we relieved by VPB-145.

Between mid-1942 until early 1944, seven Cuban ships were sunken by German submarines (U-Boats) in actions where more than eighty Cuban mariners and three Americans were killed.

=== 1945 ===
Many American squadrons trained in Cuba in navigation, bombing, air-to-air combat and close air support. A fighter squadron of P-39 Airacobras was placed in San Antonio for their defense. Towards the end of 1944 and the beginning of 1945 intense training was conducted by the USAAF 509th Composite Group using B-29s. These were tests in preparation for dropping the Atomic Bomb on Japan. They trained in long-range over-water navigation from Cuba into the Caribbean in order to acclimate themselves to similar conditions in the Pacific Ocean. From Cuba the B-29s flew to the Marianas Islands in the Pacific, in June 1945. These same aircraft would carry atomic bombs to Hiroshima and Nagasaki in August 1945. Among them also was the Enola Gay.

February 8, by means of Decree 409, the control of civil aviation is transferred from the Cuban Army to the newly created Commission of National Transportation.

=== Post-World War II ===
May 20, 1946 NAF San Julián was disestablished.

Both airports were passed to the Cuban Army for the use of the Aviation Corps after the War during the government of President Ramón Grau San Martín. San Antonio de los Baños Air Base was used by the military aviation at all times, however San Julián Air Base was used to host the San Julian Aircraft Technical School for both military and commercial aviation.

May 2, 1952 by Decree Law No. 41, the Civil Aeronautics Board (Dirección General de Transporte Aéreo) is created.

June 1952 the Army Aviation Corps changes to Cuban Army Airforce (FAEC).

December 22, 1954 the Commission of Civil Aeronautics is created by Law-Decree 1863.

=== Bay of Pigs Invasion ===
Early preparations for the invasion included the Cuban Democratic Revolutionary Front (FRD) on October 26, 1960 distributing its first Combat Order. In general terms, the order describes the logistics of an attack on the San Julián air base. That plan calls for seizing the airfield and using it as an operational base for "our air and land force." The order also describes how supplies will be obtained and communications handled during the operations.

Planning for the invasion included targeting numerous military bases including San Antonio de los Baños Air Base, the Campo Libertad Air Base, and the naval bases at Batabano and Nueva Gerona (on the Isle of Pines). San Julián Air Base was placed on the primary target list.
