= Boris Nelke =

Estonian ship captain

- Nelke aboard the SS Harjurand c. 1937
- Born: Boris Cirandi Nelke; 10 June 1899; Vihula, Governorate of Estonia
- Died: 15 March 1972 (aged 72); Örebro, Sweden
- Relatives: Alexander Nelke (brother); Karolyn Nelke (grand niece); Sandra Nurmsalu (distant cousin)
- Military career
- Allegiance: Estonia
- Service years: (Estonia) 1919 – 1941; Soviet Navy 1941
- Rank: Captain
- Commands: (Estonia) SS Harjurand (1936–1939) (Estonia) SS Eestirand (1939–1941); Soviet Navy SS Eestirand (VT-532) (1941)
- Conflicts: Battle of Tallinn (World War II)

Boris Cirandi Nelke (10 June 1899 – 15 March 1972) was an Estonian sea captain. He is most notable for taking part in the Soviet evacuation of Tallinn during World War II, where he helped thousands of Estonian conscripts to revolt against Soviet troops aboard the SS Eestirand and flee to safety.

== Early life and career ==
Nelke was the youngest of three sons to Karl and Anna Nelke. His father was a carriage maker and worked on the ceremonial carriage that was built for Queen Victoria when she visited Russia in 1894. He was born near the port city of Tallinn in Estonia. His older brothers, Waldemar and Alexander were both sailors and had already left home while Nelke was still a boy. Nelke attended the Käsmu Maritime School in the village of Käsmu. He finished his examinations and graduated on 11 April 1919, becoming an officer candidate.

In the early 1930s, the fishing industry in Estonia was just beginning to grow. Nelke, went to work with the Estonian Fishing Co., which was at the forefront of Estonian trawl fishing. Nelke's first assignment was as a mate aboard the smaller vessels in the company's fleet, fishing herring in the Baltic Sea and off the coast of Iceland. In 1937, Nelke took command of the SS Harjurand one of the smaller fishing vessels which would support the company flagship, the Eestirand, which Nelke would also later command. The success of the expedition led to the beginning of the modern Estonian fishing trade. Nelke would take command of the Eestirand in 1939.

== SS Eestirand ==
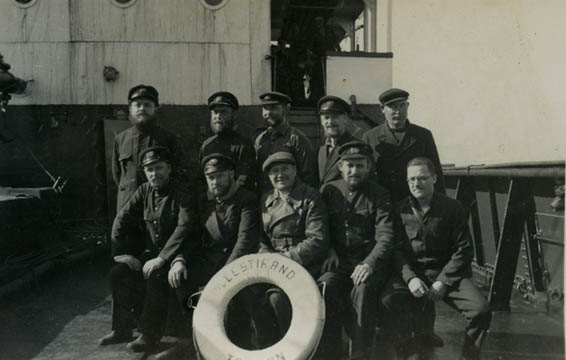
Crew of the Eestirand, c. 1939 (Nelke center bottom)

Nelke was the flagship captain for a year when Soviet forces occupied Estonia on 16 June 1940. Soon after, the fishing fleet was pressed into service of the Soviet Navy. The largest of the ships was the Eestirand which was recommissioned into the Baltic Fleet as VT-532. As captain, Nelke was to support the Soviet war effort by transporting Soviet troops and war materiel in the heavily mined Baltic Sea.

In August 1941, the Soviets began a mass evacuation of Tallinn as German forces surrounded the city. Nelke would be responsible for the transportation of roughly 3,500 Estonian conscripts and military personnel to Kronstadt.

The Eestirand was heavily damaged by German air attack on 24 August near the small island of Keri. Nelke was given a direct order from Soviet command to continue, which he ignored. Instead, Nelke set a course for Prangli Island, approximately 6 km to the south, beaching the sinking ship off the shore. Under Nelke's command, the crew of the Eestirand aided the 2,700 surviving Estonian conscripts to disarm the Soviet military personnel aboard the ship and take control of the island, where Nelke and his crew raised the ship's Estonian flag up a tall pine. The revolt allowed thousands of Estonians to escape Soviet-occupied territory and avoid mobilization to Leningrad.

A memorial was built on Prangli Island to honor the bravery of the crew of the Eestirand, and those who had died in the attack. At a service held in 2011, Viimsi Parish mayor Haldo Oravas stated that the actions of Nelke and his crew during the incident "showed the extent to which Estonians esteemed their country's and their own freedom". For his part in the revolt, Nelke was branded an "enemy of the people" by the Soviets and forced to flee Estonia to live in exile. He died in Sweden in 1972.
