= Karolyn Nelke =

American dramatist

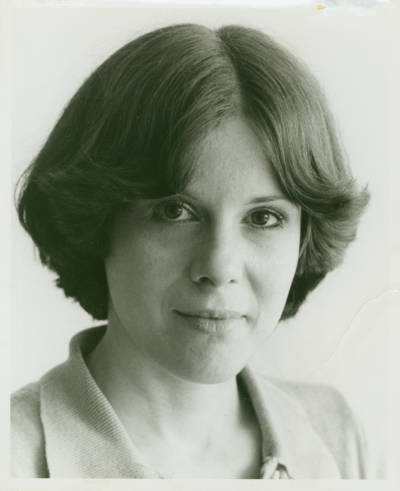
- Nelke in 1976
- Born: August 26, 1948 (age 78); Bronx, New York, U.S.
- Education: American University
- Occupations: Author, playwright
- Relatives: Alexander Nelke; Boris Nelke

Karolyn Ann Nelke (born August 26, 1948) is an American stage actor, playwright and author. She is best known for her 1982 play The Keeper: A Play About Lord Byron.

== Education ==
Nelke was born in the Bronx, New York to Harold and Teresa (née Apuzzo) Nelke in 1948. She grew up in Wappingers Falls where she attended Roy C. Ketcham High School. After high school Nelke attended Russell Sage College in Troy, New York for a time, before studying speech arts at the American University in Washington, D.C., where she graduated in 1970. She later received her master's degree in English from State University College at New Paltz and an M.Phil. in English from the Graduate Center of the City University of New York.

== Career ==
After college, Nelke was a member of the Folger Theatre Group, now the Shakespeare Theatre Company, in Washington, D.C. She appeared in several productions with the Folger Group, including Natural and Unnatural Acts where she played the role of Lady Caroline Lamb, best known for her affair with Lord Byron, and inspiration for Nelke's most notable play.

In 1976, Nelke was the first playwright to be awarded the Lucy Martin Donnelly Fellowship from Bryn Mawr College for her Byron play The Keeper, which was produced by the Philadelphia Theatre Company in their 1976-1977 season and directed by Robert Hedley. The Fellowship awarded Nelke with a cash grant, and an invitation to conduct workshops with Bryn Mawr and Haverford College students with regards to the production of her play during the academic year. In 1982, The Keeper was produced at the Philadelphia Drama Guild and starred Dwight Schultz as Lord Byron, with Patricia Elliott as his sister Augusta, Valerie Mahaffey as his wife Annabella, and Richard Frank as his friend John Cam Hobhouse. The play was directed by Steven Schachter and featured in The Burns Mantle Theater Yearbook: "The Best Plays of 1982-1983".

Nelke's second play, a post World War I love story called Casualties, made its debut at In the Works, Amherst MA (André Bishop Artistic Director). It was further developed at the Old Vat Room in Washington D.C. during Arena Stage's 1978-1979 season. and was ultimately directed by Norman René, first Off-Off Broadway at Mr. Rene's The Production Company, and then Off-Broadway at the Theatre at St. Clement's.

In 1981, Nelke was included in a Rockefeller Foundation program for the development of women playwrights at Actors Theater of Louisville, and the one act play she wrote for this program, Finish Lines, later won her a CBS/Dramatists Guild award. In 1985, Nelke was commissioned by the Philadelphia Drama Guild to create a second act for Finish Lines, and was also invited by the Guild to develop a stage adaptation of the Theodore Dreiser novel, Sister Carrie. It was later scheduled to premiere as the closing production of the 1988-1989 season, although it was subsequently scratched from the season due to the full-scale production concerns of the large cast and running time of the script.

== Personal life ==
Nelke also has had recipes featured in Richard Sax's Classic Home Deserts:A Treasury of Heirloom and Contemporary Recipes. One of her paternal great-uncles, Alexander Nelke was a notable maritime painter, and another, Boris Nelke, was the captain of the Estonian ship Eestirand who saved thousands of Estonian conscripts during the Soviet evacuation of Tallinn in 1941.
