= Alexander Nelke =

Estonian-American painter

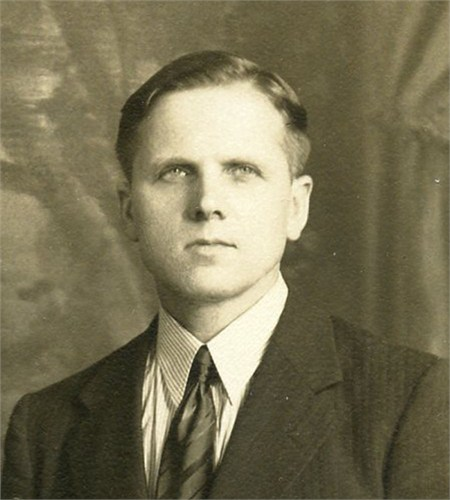
- Alexander Nelke circa 1939
- Born: Sergei Alexander Nelke; December 14, 1894; Vihula, Governorate of Estonia, Russian Empire
- Died: August 14, 1974 (aged 79); Brooklyn, New York, United States
- Occupations: Artist; carpenter; seaman
- Known for: Marine and landscape paintings
- Style: Realism
- Relatives: Boris Nelke; Karolyn Nelke

Signature
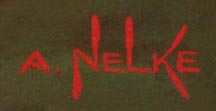

Sergei Alexander Nelke (December 14, 1894 – August 14, 1974) was an Estonian-American artist in the mid to late 20th century. He is primarily known as marine and landscape artist specializing in square rigged sailing vessels.

== Early life ==
Nelke was the middle of three sons to Karl and Anna Nelke. His father was a carriage maker and worked on the ceremonial carriage that was built for Queen Victoria when she visited Russia in 1894. After completing his secondary education in 1910, Nelke began his career as a seaman working as a ships carpenter, eventually rising to the rank of 2nd Mate. Nelke became an expert ships carpenter and rigger and acquired a thorough knowledge of the sea and sailing vessels from all over the world. Nelke would spend over fifteen years at sea before finally settling in Brooklyn, NY, near his brother Waldemar. He became a naturalized citizen of the United States in 1945.

== Career as an artist ==
Nelke was primarily self taught as an artist and began painting by using cut up sails as canvas while out at sea. After settling in America, Nelke continued working as a carpenter and painted out of his studio on Baltic Street in Brooklyn. He studied for a time under fellow marine painter William C. Ehrig.

His background as a seaman and ship builder allowed him to produce highly detailed and accurate paintings of seascapes and nautical vessels. He was considered an authority in the field of maritime art and also in the detail of sailing ships (especially rigging) and their construction. He was often consulted on high-end ship models. This attracted interest in the commercial market and Nelke was commissioned to paint several pieces which would be reproduced on items such as prints, playing cards and jigsaw puzzles to be sold to the public.

Nelke sat on the committee for the Washington Square Outdoor Art Exhibit, which was started by Vernon Carroll Porter in 1931 and was also a former director of the Brooklyn Outdoor Art Show. He was a member of the Salons of America, and exhibited his work with them in 1934 and 1936. He also exhibited with The Society of Independent Artists in 1934, 1936, 1938, 1940 and 1944.

At the age of 79, Nelke died in his Brooklyn, New York apartment on August 14, 1974. He is buried near his brother Waldemar in Wappingers Falls, New York.
