= Cunda =

Cunda may refer to:

- Cunda Kammāraputta, a character associated with Gautama Buddha
- Cunda Island, or Alibey Island, in Ayvalık, Turkey

== See also ==
- Kunda (disambiguation)
- Miguel Angel Lavié da Cunda, Uruguayan footballer
