= Eestirand =

1910 Estonian ship

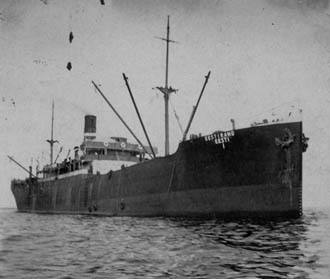
- Eestirand at sea, circa 1932

History
- Name: (United Kingdom) Strathardle (1910–16); (United States) Harold Dollar (1916–27); (United Kingdom) Glenbeath (1927–32); (Estonia) Eestirand (1932–40); (Soviet Union) Eestirand (1940–41); (Soviet Union) VT-532 (1941)
- Owner: Burrell & Son Steam Ship Co. Ltd, Glasgow (1910–16); Dollar Steamship Lines, Ltd, San Francisco (1916–27); Waverley Shipping Company, Ltd, Glasgow (1927–32); Estonian Fishing Co., Tallinn (1932–41)
- Builder: Archibald McMillan & Son Ltd; Dumbarton, Scotland
- Launched: 1932 (As Eestirand)
- Completed: 1910
- Acquired: 12 May 1932 (As Eestirand)
- Out of service: 24 August 1941
- Fate: Sunk 24 August 1941 by German aircraft

General characteristics
- Tonnage: 4,377 GRT
- Length: 376.5 ft (114.8 m) p/p
- Beam: 52.2 ft (15.9 m)
- Draught: 23 ft (6.9 m)
- Depth: 25.5 ft (7.8 m)
- Installed power: 320 NHP
- Propulsion: triple-expansion steam engine
- Speed: 9.5 kn (10.9 mph)

SS Eestirand (Estonian for Estonian Coast or Estonian Beach), built in 1910, was an Estonian steel-hulled cargo steamship. She was one of the largest ships in her class at the time and served as the mother-ship of the first Estonian herring expeditions in the 1930s. After Estonia was occupied by the Soviet Union in 1940, she was used as a Soviet Navy transport vessel in World War II until beached in 1941 on Prangli Island during the Soviet evacuation of Tallinn.

== History ==
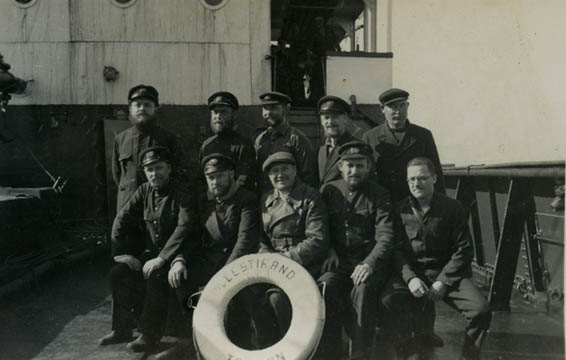
Crew of Eestirand, 1930s (Cpt. Boris Nelke bottom centre)

The ship was built in 1910 by Archibald McMillan & Son Ltd. in Dumbarton, Scotland and launched as Starthardle for the Burrell & Son Steamship Line of Glasgow. In 1916 the Scottish-American shipping magnate Robert Dollar bought her for his Dollar Steamship Lines. Renamed Harold Dollar, she worked between New York City and Asia.

In 1932 the Estonian Fishing Co. bought the ship, then called Glenbeath, from the Waverley Shipping Company in Sunderland, England, for £7,500 pounds sterling. She came to the Estonian port of Tallinn on 12 May where she was renamed Eestirand and refitted for the fishing trade. At the time she was the largest ship in the Estonian merchant fleet.

The ship made her maiden voyage as Eestirand on 9 June 1932 under captain Jakob Lepni, with a crew of 142 men and women. She served as the mother ship for the first Estonian herring expedition off the coast of Iceland and took in her first herring catch on 7 July. After its return to Tallinn on 15 September with its cargo, the expedition was considered a success, with Estonian fish exports now exceeding imports. Eestirand continued to serve as the flagship for the Estonian fishing industry until she was requisitioned into the Soviet Navy following the Soviet occupation of the Baltic states.

== Service in World War II ==
In World War II Eestirand was recommissioned into the Soviet Baltic Fleet as VT-532 in 1941. Her primary role was transporting troops and war materiel in the heavily mined Baltic Sea. As German troops advanced on Tallinn in August 1941, the Soviets began preparations for evacuation. Eestirand would be part of a convoy or ships responsible for the evacuation of Soviet military personnel and Estonian conscripts to Kronstadt to help relieve the German siege of Leningrad.

On 24 August 1941 Eestirand came under attack from German planes as she neared the Keri Lighthouse on Keri Island. 44 men were killed in the bombardment, and many more drowned after falling overboard. The commander of the evacuation fleet, Vladimir Tributs, ordered Eestirand's captain, Boris Nelke, to continue to Kronstadt. Ignoring the order, Nelke instead chose to head to Prangli Island, about 6 kilometres (3.2 nmi) to the south, and beach the badly damaged ship on the shore of the island.

Once beached, Nelke and his crew helped the 2,700 surviving Estonian conscripts to disarm the Soviet military personnel aboard the ship and escape onto the island and avoid mobilization to Leningrad. For his part in the revolt, Nelke was branded an "enemy of the people" by the Soviets and forced to flee Estonia to live in exile. He died in Sweden in 1972.

In 1946 the wreck of Eestirand was raised and towed to Kopli Bay for scrapping.

== Monument ==
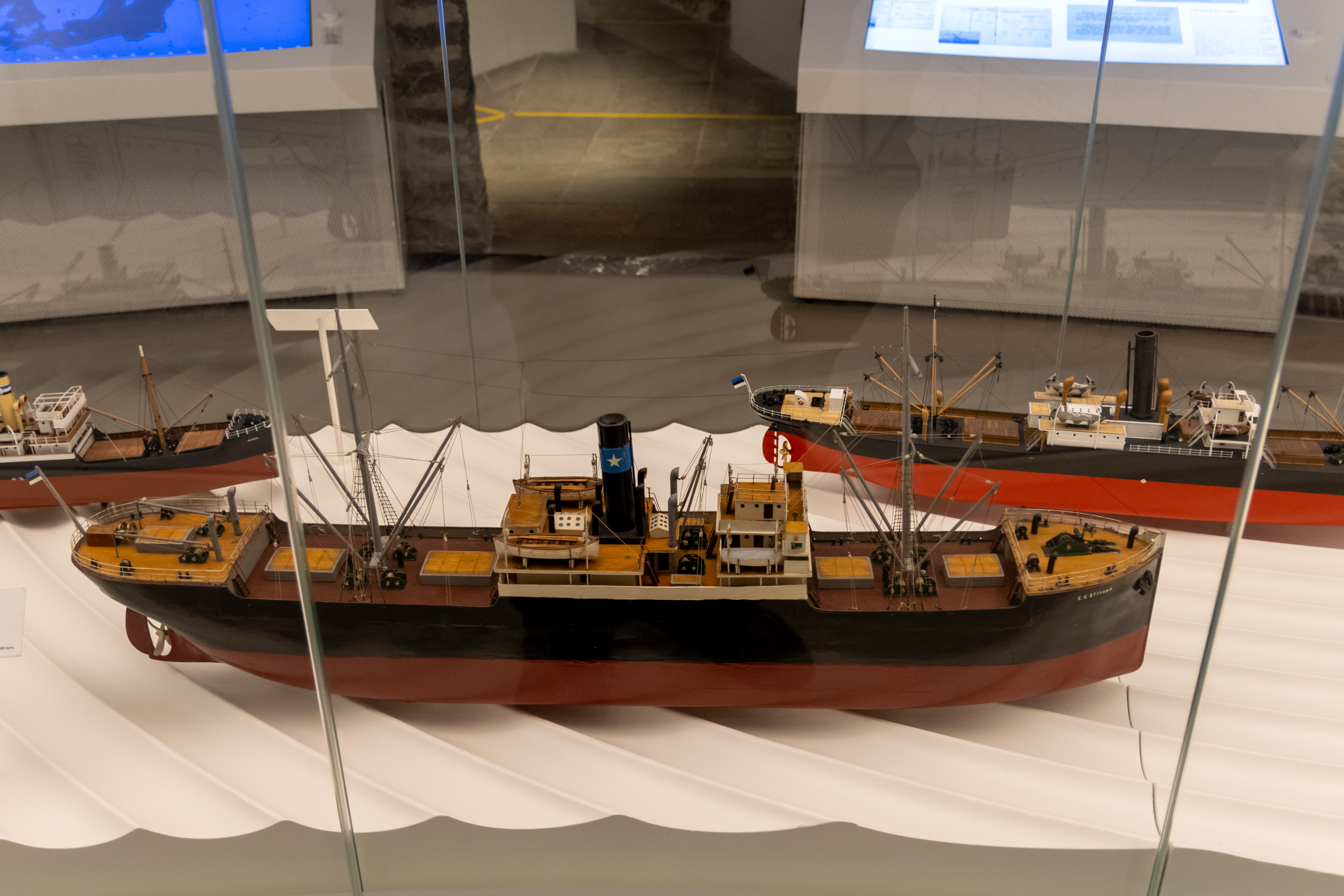
Model of the ship at the Estonian Maritime Museum

After the war a monument was erected on Prangli Island to honor the passengers and crew of Eestirand who were killed on that voyage. The monument includes a large 4-metre (13 ft)-high wooden cross with the inscription "Eestirand 24–08–41", adorned with a life preserver from the ship. The original anchor was salvaged from the wreck and set in concrete at the foot of the cross. 42 smaller white wooden crosses stand for those killed in the attack.

A central granite pedestal bears a plaque which reads (translated from Estonian):

"Here at Prangli Island off the coast of Keri on 24 and 25 August 1941, the steam ship Eestirand was lost to bombing of German aircraft. For dozens of Estonians and Russian Jews it was their last sea voyage."

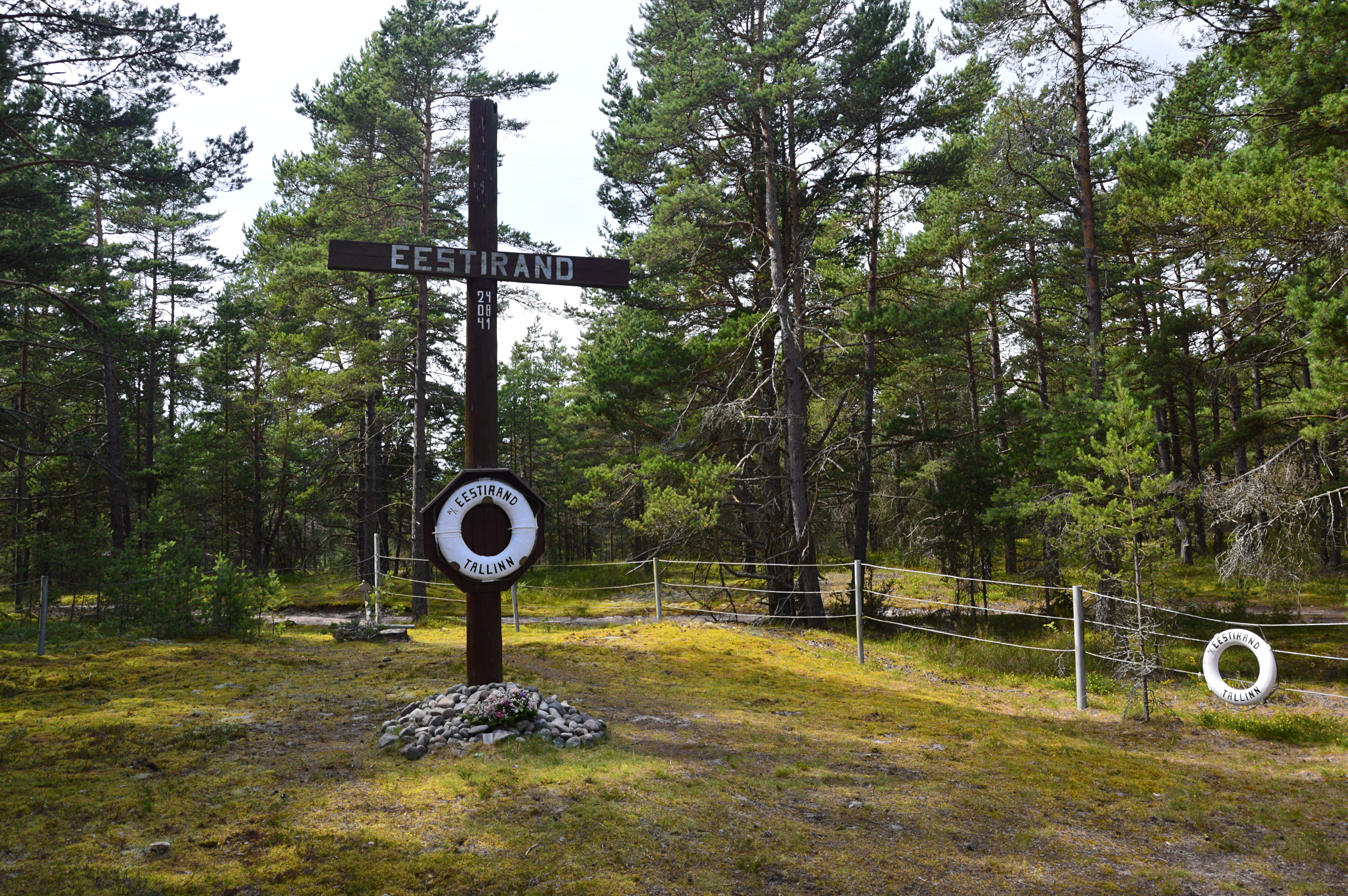

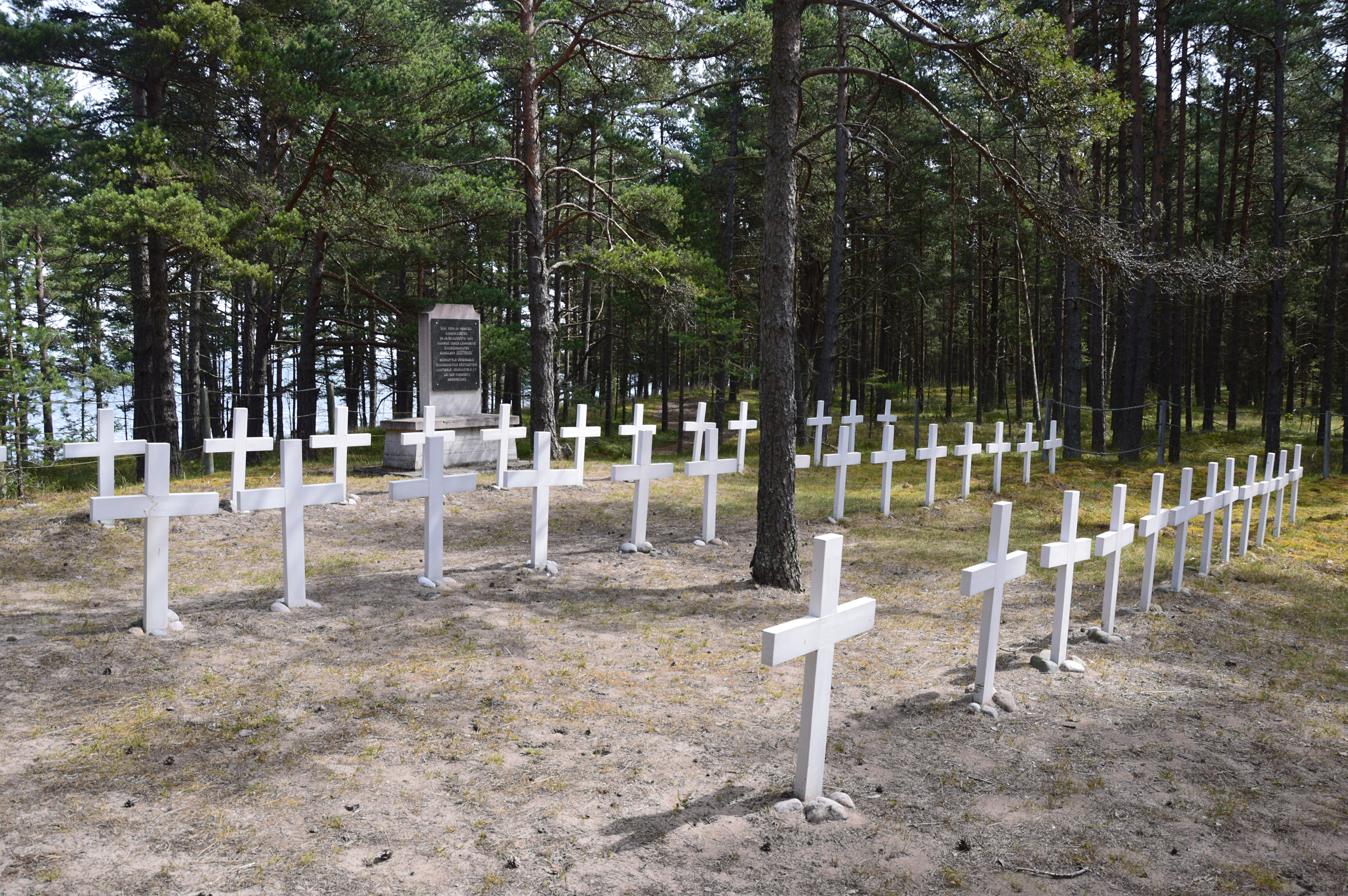

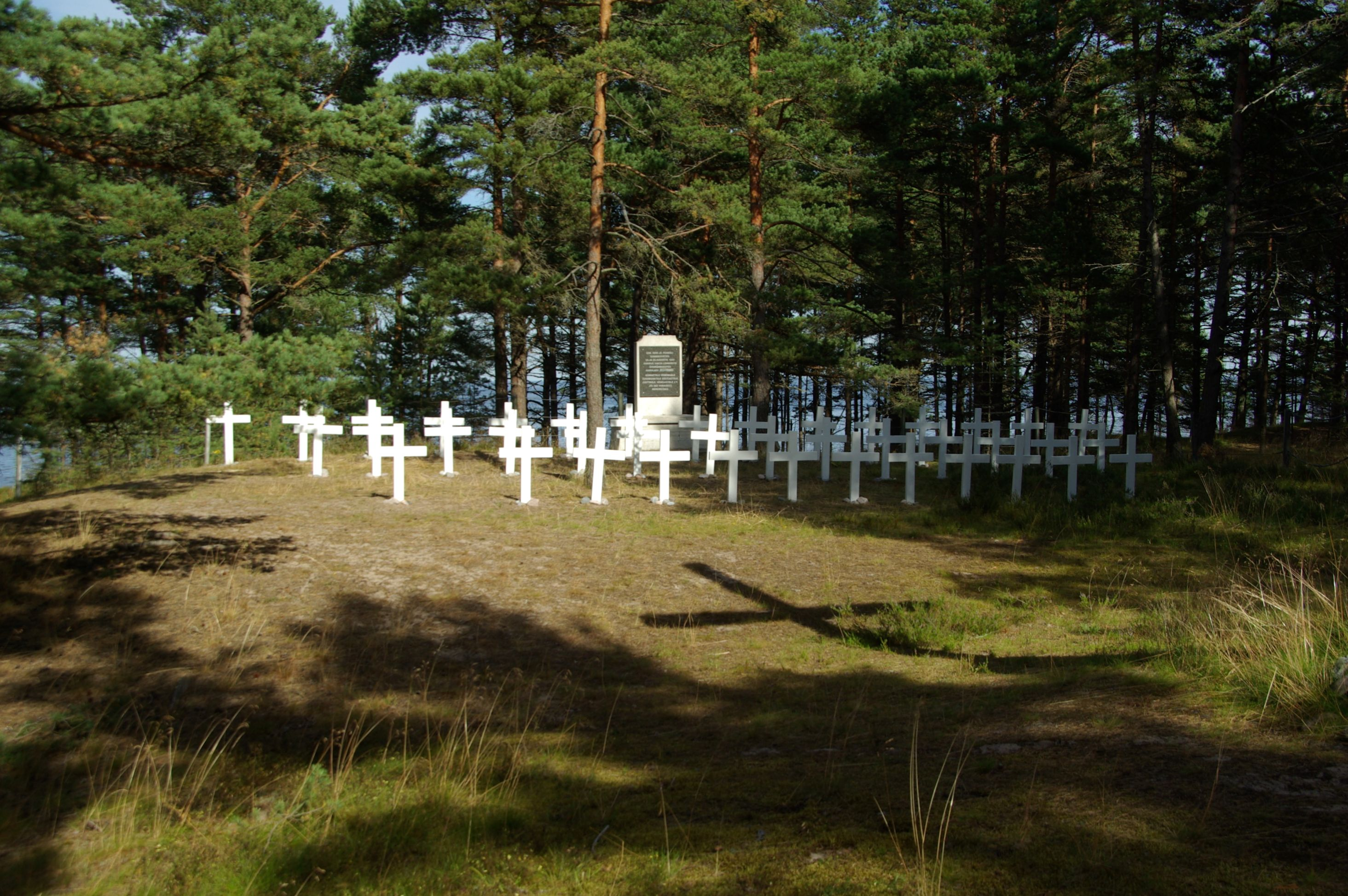
