= Kunda =

Kunda may refer to:

== Places ==
=== Estonia ===
- Kunda, Estonia, a town in Lääne-Viru County, Estonia
- Kunda, Viru-Nigula Parish, a village in Viru-Nigula Parish, Lääne-Viru County, Estonia
- Kunda River, a river in Lääne-Viru County, Estonia

=== India ===
- Kunda, India, a town in Pratapgarh district in the Indian state of Uttar Pradesh
- Kunda block, a community development block in Chatra district, Jharkhand
  - Kunda, Chatra, a village in Chatra district, Jharkhand

=== Others ===
- Khunda, a union council of Tehsil Lahore, Swabi District, Khyber Pakhtonkhwa, Pakistan
- Kunda Park, Queensland, an industrial suburb in Sunshine Coast, Queensland, Australia
- Kunda Station, a train station in Miyazu, Kyoto Prefecture, Japan

== People ==
- George Kunda (1956–2012), Zambian politician
- Maksim Kunda (born 1989), Belarusian archer
- Masahiro Kunda (born 1966), Japanese rugby union player
- Stephen Kunda (born 1984), Zambian football player
- Victor Kunda (born 1999), English internet personality and model
- Ziva Kunda (1955–2004), Canadian social psychologist

== Other uses ==
- Kunda people, a Bantu-speaking ethnic group in Mozambique, Zambia, and Zimbabwe
- Kunda culture, an archaeological culture classification, first discovered near Kunda, Estonia
- Touré Kunda, a Senegalese band
- Kunda, one of many names of a Temple tank, a well or reservoir built as part of Indian temple complexes

== See also ==
- Cunda (disambiguation)
- Kund
