= Soviet evacuation of Tallinn =

1941 Soviet naval evacuation from Tallinn to Kronstadt

- Part of the Eastern Front (World War II), Continuation War and Summer War
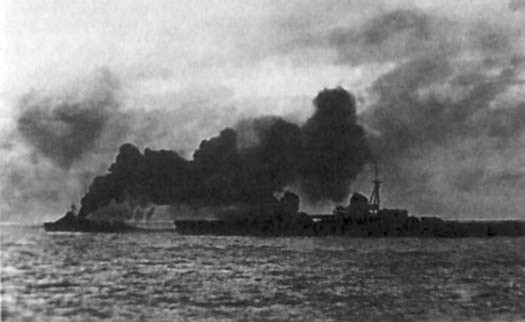
- Soviet cruiser Kirov protected by smoke during the evacuation of Tallinn, August 1941
Date	27–31 August 1941
Location	Tallinn, Gulf of Finland, waters off the Juminda Peninsula 59°26′47″N 24°46′05″E
Result	Finnish–German victory; Soviet evacuation partly successful but with heavy losses

Belligerents
Finland; Germany	Soviet Union

Commanders and leaders
(Nazi Germany) Alfred Keller (Nazi Germany) Wolfram von Richthofen (Nazi Germany) Hans Bütow (Nazi Germany) Richard Linke (Nazi Germany) Dietrich Peltz (Finland) Eero Rahola	(Soviet Union) Vladimir Tributs (Soviet Union) Kliment Voroshilov (Soviet Union) Yuri Panteleyev (Soviet Union) Yuri Rall

Strength
German forces: 110 aircraft and 17 artillery battalions Finnish forces: 10 aircraft, 3 torpedo boats and 2 coastal batteries	151 warships 20 transports 54 auxiliary vessels 65 aircraft 19,903 naval personnel 8,670 Red Army soldiers 12,806 civilians

Casualties and losses
3–10 aircraft lost, according to different estimates	19 warships lost 18 transports lost 25 auxiliary vessels lost 8,600 naval personnel killed 1,740 Red Army soldiers killed 4,628 civilians killed

The Soviet evacuation of Tallinn was a Soviet naval evacuation operation carried out from 27 to 31 August 1941 during World War II, the Continuation War, and the German invasion of the Soviet Union. It involved the withdrawal of ships of the Baltic Fleet, units of the Red Army, and Soviet civilians from the encircled Soviet naval base at Tallinn in Soviet-occupied Estonia to Kronstadt, near Leningrad.

The operation is also known in English as the Tallinn disaster, the Russian Dunkirk, and the Juminda mine battle. It is known in Russian as the Tallinn passage or Tallinn breakthrough (Russian: Таллинский переход, romanized: Tallinsky perekhod; Russian: Таллинский прорыв, romanized: Tallinsky proryv), and has also been referred to in Russian as the Tallinn tragedy (Russian: Таллинская трагедия, romanized: Tallinskaya tragediya) and the Juminda mine battle (Russian: минное сражение Юминда, romanized: minnoye srazheniye Yuminda). In German it was known as the Mine Battle off Reval (Minenschlacht vor Reval), using the historical German name for Tallinn. In Estonian it is known as the Juminda mine battle (Juminda miinilahing).

During the evacuation the Soviet fleet encountered extensive minefields laid by Finnish and German naval forces near the Juminda Peninsula. The convoys were also attacked by German aircraft, coastal artillery, and torpedo boats. Although the operation succeeded in bringing a large part of the fleet and many evacuees to Kronstadt, it caused one of the heaviest Soviet naval losses of the war. Estimates of losses differ considerably. Some accounts give at least 12,400 dead and 84 vessels sunk or damaged beyond repair, while Russian naval sources commonly give about 15,000 dead and around 50–62 ships and vessels lost. Some German and Estonian accounts give higher casualty figures, up to about 25,000 dead.

== Background ==
Soviet forces occupied Estonia in June 1940. After the German invasion of the Soviet Union began on 22 June 1941, Army Group North advanced rapidly through the Baltic region. By late August Tallinn, the main base of the Soviet Baltic Fleet, had been surrounded by German forces, while a large part of the fleet remained in Tallinn harbour. Tallinn was of major operational importance because it was the Baltic Fleet's principal forward base. The city and harbour, however, were poorly suited to a rapid evacuation under fire. The defence of Tallinn was carried out by the Soviet 10th Rifle Corps, naval detachments, NKVD units, militia formations, and other improvised forces. On 7 August 1941 German forces reached the Gulf of Finland near Kunda, cutting off Soviet forces in the Tallinn area from the main forces of the Soviet Northern Front. The possibility of evacuating the fleet and Soviet forces from Tallinn had been discussed before the final German assault. Soviet naval commanders raised the question of withdrawal during August, but permission to evacuate was not granted until 26 August. By then German artillery was already able to fire on Tallinn harbour, and the evacuation had to be organized under severe pressure.

== Finnish and German preparations ==
Expecting a Soviet attempt to break out of Tallinn, the Kriegsmarine and the Finnish Navy began laying minefields off Cape Juminda on 8 August 1941. Soviet minesweepers attempted to clear routes through the minefields, but bad weather and the scale of the barriers limited the effectiveness of minesweeping before the evacuation began. German coastal artillery installed a battery of 150 mm guns near Cape Juminda. Finnish motor torpedo boats and German S-boats were concentrated in the Gulf of Finland, including the German 3rd Schnellboot Flotilla with S-26, S-27, S-39, S-40 and S-101 near Suomenlinna outside Helsinki. German Junkers Ju 88 bombers from Kampfgruppe 806, based on airfields in Estonia, were also prepared for attacks on the Soviet ships. German accounts give detailed figures for the mine barriers. According to one account, the German minelayers Cobra, Königin Luise and Kaiser, together with auxiliary vessels, laid 673 EMC mines (moored contact mines) and 636 explosive buoys, while the Finnish minelayers Riilahti and Ruotsinsalmi laid a further 696 mines and 100 explosive buoys. Poul Grooss gives a higher total for the barriers off Juminda, with 2,828 mines and 1,487 explosive buoys.

== Soviet forces and organization ==
The Soviet evacuation force included warships of the Baltic Fleet, transport ships, auxiliary vessels, and vessels carrying military personnel and civilians. Twenty large transports, eight auxiliary ships, nine small transports, a tanker, a tug, and a tender were organized into four convoys. These were protected by the cruiser Kirov, carrying Admiral Vladimir Tributs, two flotilla leaders, destroyers, torpedo boats, submarines, minesweepers, submarine chasers, gunboats, patrol vessels and other craft. Russian naval sources give a broader total of 225 ships and vessels leaving Tallinn, including 151 warships, 54 auxiliary vessels, and 20 transports. According to this count, 163 reached Kronstadt, including 132 warships, 29 auxiliary vessels, and two transports. This figure does not include all small civilian craft and improvised vessels that also escaped from Tallinn.

=== Soviet naval groupings ===
Soviet naval groupings during the evacuation
Group	Commander	Main role and vessels	Approximate number of vessels
1st convoy	Captain 2nd rank N. Bogdanov	Transport convoy including destroyers, submarines, minesweepers, patrol craft, rescue ship Saturn, staff ship Vironia, icebreaker Krišjānis Valdemārs, floating workshop Serp i Molot, and transports including Alev, Kalpaks, Järvamaa, Ella and Atis Kronvaldis	32
2nd convoy	Captain 2nd rank N. Antonov	Transport convoy including gunboat Moskva, patrol ship Chapaev, minesweepers, netlayers, submarine chaser MO-200, and transports including Ergonautis, Ivan Papanin, Naissaar, Kazakhstan and Šiauliai	21
3rd convoy	Captain 2nd rank J. Janson	Transport convoy including gunboat Amgun, patrol ship Uran, minesweepers, submarine chasers, decoy ship Hiiusaar, rescue ship Kolyvan, tanker No. 12, and transports including Lake Lucerne, Luga, Skrunda, Tobol and Vtoraya Pyatiletka	21
Main force	Vice Admiral Vladimir Tributs	Combat group centred on cruiser Kirov, with destroyers Gordy, Yakov Sverdlov and Smetlivy, submarines, minesweepers, torpedo boats, submarine chasers, and icebreaker Suur Tõll; tasked with covering the 1st and 2nd convoys	26
4th convoy	Captain 3rd rank S. Glukhovtsev	Transport convoy including gunboat I-8, patrol ships, submarine Shch-301, minesweepers, hydrographic vessels, tugs, schooner Atta, transport Everita, icebreaker Tasuja, and other vessels; joined by vessels from Paldiski	38, plus 12 from Paldiski
Covering detachment	Rear Admiral Yuri Panteleyev	Combat group including flotilla leaders Leningrad and Minsk, destroyers Skory and Slavny, submarines, minesweepers, torpedo boats, submarine chasers, and rescue ship Neptun; tasked with covering the 3rd and 4th convoys	23
Rearguard	Rear Admiral Yuri Rall	Rearguard including destroyers Artyom, Kalinin and Volodarsky, patrol ships Burya, Jupiter, Sneg, Topaz and Tsiklon, torpedo boats, submarine chasers, steamer Peterhof, tugs, and small craft	21

== Evacuation from Tallinn ==
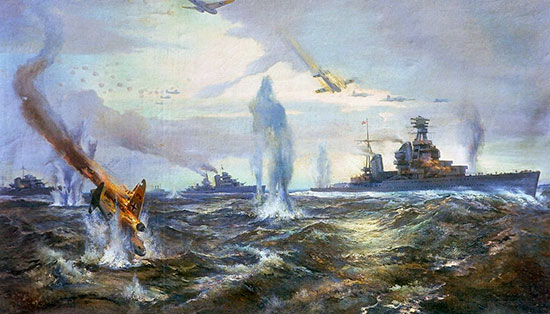
The voyage of ships of the Red Banner Baltic Fleet from Tallinn to Kronstadt, August 1941. Artist A. A. Blinkov. (1946)

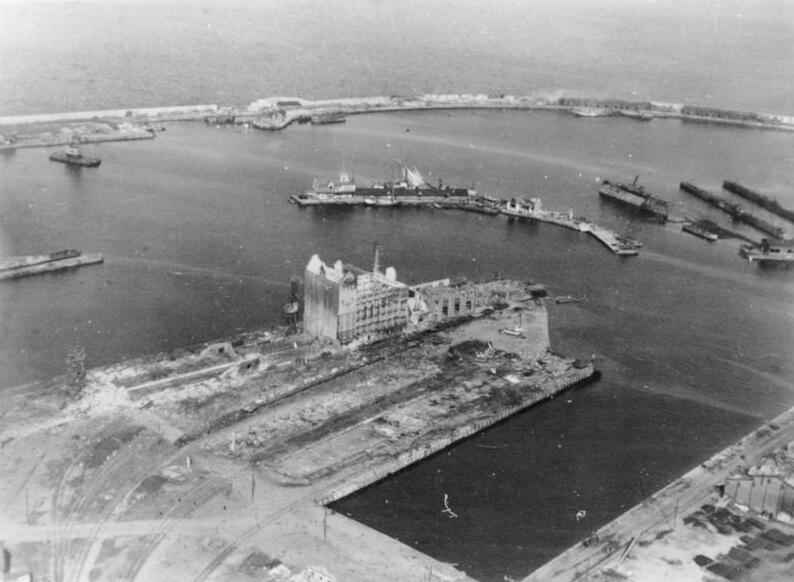
The Port of Tallinn on 1 September 1941 after having been seized by the Germans

During the night of 27–28 August 1941 the Soviet 10th Rifle Corps disengaged from the fighting and began boarding transports in Tallinn harbour. Loading was carried out in several parts of Tallinn Bay, including the Merchant Harbour, Mine Harbour, Bekker Harbour, Russo-Baltic Harbour and other areas. German artillery fire and air attacks disrupted the planned embarkation. Some transports were unable to take aboard their intended passengers, while others became heavily overloaded. In many cases passenger records were incomplete. The embarkation was protected by smoke screens. However, minesweeping in the days before the evacuation was ineffective, partly because of bad weather, and there were no Soviet aircraft available to provide effective protection over the harbour. Heavy German shelling and aerial bombardment killed at least 1,000 evacuees before the convoys had left the harbour area.

== Passage through the Gulf of Finland ==
The Soviet convoys began leaving Tallinn on 28 August. Bad weather and the slow movement of the transports delayed the operation. As a result, many ships reached the Juminda minefield during darkness rather than by daylight as planned. The main force and covering detachment followed minesweepers, but the transport convoys and the rearguard were more exposed. On 28 August German aircraft, including units of Kampfgruppe 806 and Kampfgeschwader 77, attacked the Soviet ships. Several transports and auxiliary vessels were sunk or damaged. According to one German-derived account, the steamer Vironia, the transport Lucerne, the transport Atis Kronvaldis, and the icebreaker Krišjānis Valdemārs were among the ships sunk on 28 August. The need to avoid air attack and mines forced parts of the Soviet formation into dangerous waters. Many warships, including five destroyers, struck mines and sank. During the night of 28–29 August Finnish and German torpedo boats attacked the disorganized Soviet formation. The chaotic situation, darkness, mines, and continuing air threat made organized minesweeping nearly impossible. At about midnight the Soviet ships stopped and anchored in mined waters. On 29 August the Luftwaffe, now reinforced by additional bomber formations including KG 76, KG 4 and KG 1, continued attacks against the convoy remnants off Suursaari. The transport ships Vtoraya Pyatiletka, Kalpaks and Leningradsovet were among the vessels sunk, while Ivan Papanin, Saule, Kazakhstan and Serp i Molot were damaged. The damaged merchant ship Kazakhstan disembarked about 2,300 of the approximately 5,000 people on board before continuing to Kronstadt. In the following days vessels operating from Suursaari rescued 12,160 survivors.

== Outcome ==
The evacuation succeeded in bringing much of the Baltic Fleet to Kronstadt and evacuating many soldiers and civilians from Tallinn. One summary gives 165 ships, 28,000 passengers and 66,000 tons of equipment evacuated to Soviet-held ports. The cost, however, was extremely high. The evacuation removed the Soviet naval force from Tallinn but did not prevent the fall of the city, which German forces occupied after the Soviet withdrawal. The Baltic Fleet reached Kronstadt but was weakened by the loss of destroyers, submarines, patrol vessels, minesweepers, transports and auxiliary craft. The loss of trained sailors, soldiers, civilian workers and evacuees was also severe.

== Loss estimates ==
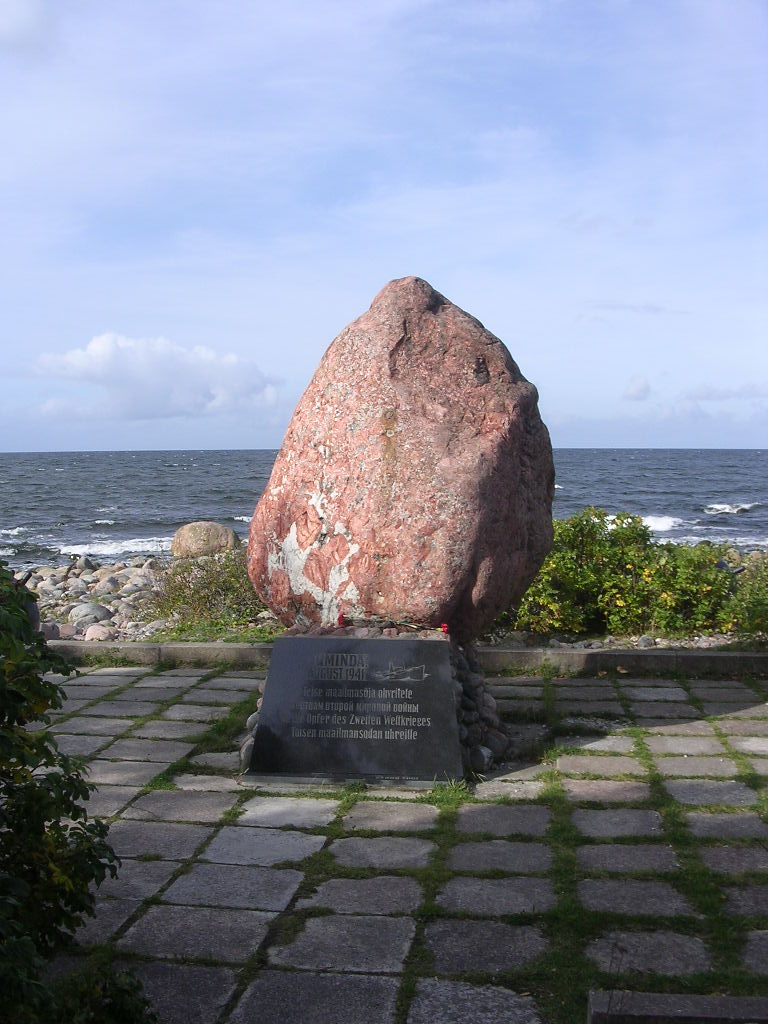
Juminda monument

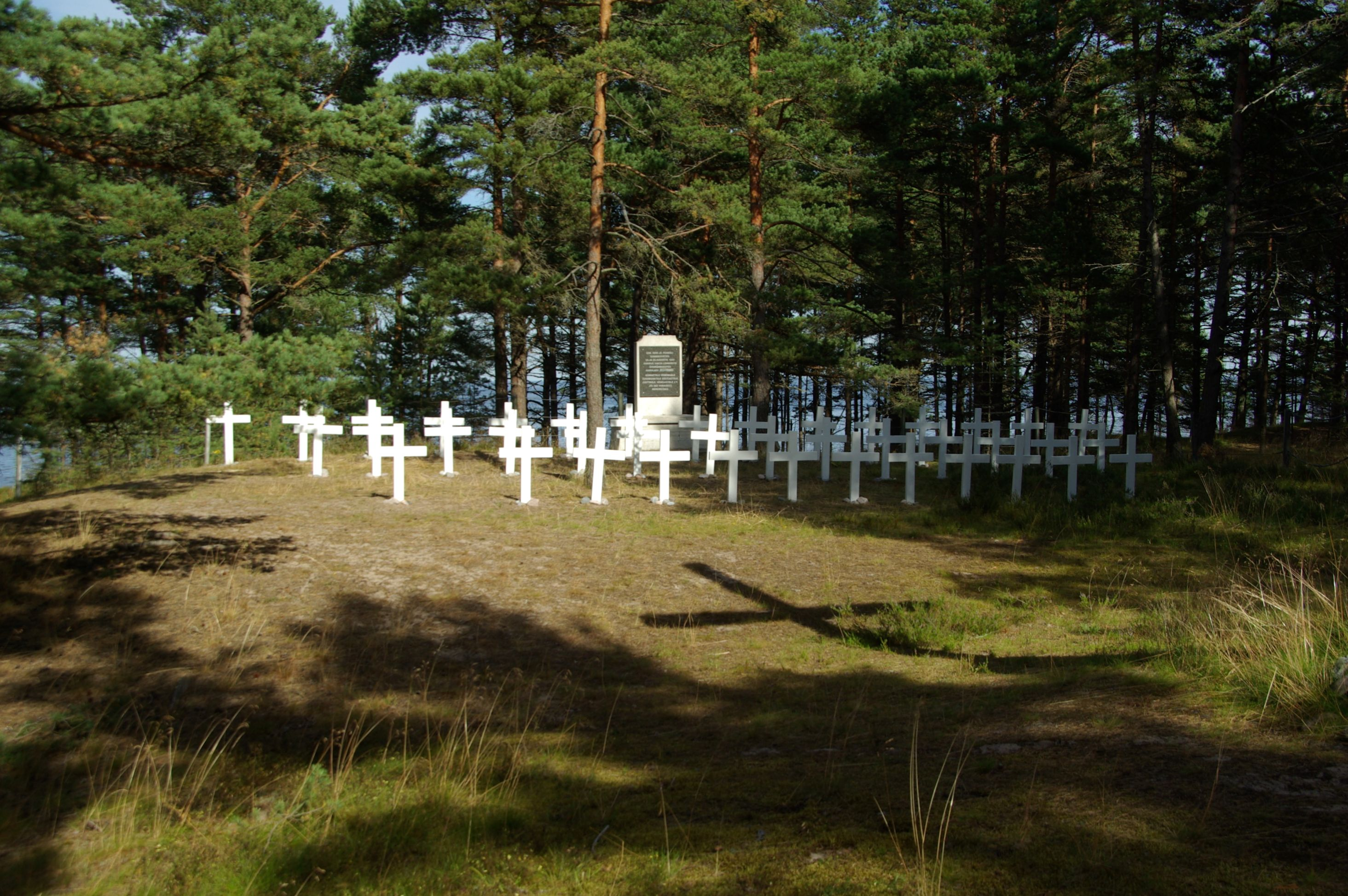
Graves of men lost on Eestirand on Prangli Island where it was beached

The losses remain disputed, partly because wartime records were incomplete and because different authors count vessels and casualties differently. Some sources count only ships sunk during the main passage, while others include vessels damaged beyond repair, ships lost shortly after the passage, or small auxiliary craft. Russian naval works give differing totals. The official Soviet naval history gave 62 warships, transports and auxiliary vessels lost. The naval historian V. I. Achkasov gave 50; G. A. Ammon gave 52; and A. Kolpakov gave 15 warships and 46 transports and auxiliary vessels, a total of 61. Later Russian calculations commonly list 19 warships and 43 transports or auxiliary vessels lost, for a total of 62. According to one detailed Russian calculation, 31 vessels were lost to mines, 19 to air attack, one to coastal artillery, one to torpedo attack, five in accidents or collisions while evading air attack, and three for unknown reasons. Estonian summaries often give approximately 60 ships and about 15,000 dead. Some German and Estonian accounts give casualty figures as high as about 25,000.

Published estimates of Soviet losses
Source or tradition	Ships and vessels lost	Human losses	Notes
Official Soviet naval history	62	Not uniform in later summaries	Includes warships, transports and auxiliary vessels
V. I. Achkasov	50	Not specified here	Lower Soviet/Russian naval-historical estimate
G. A. Ammon	52	Not specified here	Soviet/Russian naval estimate
A. Kolpakov	15 warships and 46 transports or auxiliary vessels	Not specified here	Total of 61 vessels
R. A. Zubkov	19 warships and 43 transports or auxiliary vessels	About 15,111 dead	Gives 62 total vessel losses and separates loss causes
Estonian summaries	About 60	About 15,000 dead	The event is commonly remembered as the Juminda mine battle
Some German and Estonian accounts	At least 52 or about 60	Up to about 25,000 dead	Higher casualty estimate; should be treated as source-dependent
Existing English-language summary	84 sunk or damaged irreparably	At least 12,400 drowned	Counts irreparable damage as well as sinkings

== Principal Soviet ships lost ==
The following table lists principal Soviet warships, transports and auxiliary vessels reported lost during the evacuation. The list is not exhaustive, and details vary between sources.

Principal Soviet warships, transports and auxiliary vessels lost during the evacuation
Ship	Type	Date lost	Cause	Notes
Skory	Destroyer	28 August	Mine	One of five destroyers lost during the passage
Yakov Sverdlov	Destroyer	28 August	Mine	Former Novik-class destroyer
Kalinin	Destroyer	28 August	Mine	Lost in the rearguard
Volodarsky	Destroyer	28 August	Mine	Lost in the rearguard
Artyom	Destroyer	28 August	Mine	Lost in the rearguard
S-5	Submarine	28 August	Mine	Soviet S-class submarine
Shch-301	Submarine	28 August	Mine	Soviet Shchuka-class submarine
Tsiklon	Patrol vessel	28 August	Mine	Lost off Cape Juminda
Sneg	Patrol vessel	28 August	Mine	Lost off Cape Juminda
Topaz	Patrol vessel	Unknown	Unknown / disputed	Listed among Soviet patrol-vessel losses
I-8	Gunboat	28 August	Mine	Lost off Cape Juminda
No. 71 Krab	Minesweeper	28 August	Mine	Listed among Soviet minesweeper losses
No. 42 Lenvodput-13	Minesweeper	28 August	Mine	Listed among Soviet minesweeper losses
Hiiusaar	Decoy vessel	Unknown	Unknown / disputed	Listed among Soviet warship and auxiliary losses
Krišjānis Valdemārs	Icebreaker	28 August	Mine / air attack, depending on source	Sunk with heavy loss of life
Vironia	Staff ship / passenger ship	28–29 August	Mine	Hit a mine off Cape Juminda and sank rapidly; about 1,300 people were killed according to one account
VT-530 Ella	Hospital transport	28 August	Mine	Struck a mine off Cape Juminda; hundreds of crew and passengers were killed
VT-545 Everita	Transport	28 August	Mine	Carrying the garrison of Naissaar; sank very rapidly after striking a mine
VT-584 Naissaar	Transport	28 August	Mine	Listed among transport losses
VT-537 Ergonautis	Transport	28 August	Mine	Listed among transport losses
Kolyvan	Rescue vessel	28 August	Mine	Listed among auxiliary losses
Saturn	Rescue vessel	29 August	Mine	Listed among auxiliary losses
VT-501 Balkhash	Transport	29 August	Mine	Listed among transport losses
VT-518 Luga	Hospital transport	29 August	Mine / later artillery fire	Damaged by a mine and later sunk after being abandoned
VT-524 Kalpaks	Hospital transport	29 August	Air attack	Sunk by German aircraft
VT-511 Alev	Hospital transport	29 August	Air attack	Sunk by German aircraft
VT-563 Atis Kronvaldis	Transport	28–29 August	Air attack	Sunk during the passage
Tanker No. 12	Tanker	29 August	Air attack	Listed among transport losses
VT-543 Vtoraya Pyatiletka	Transport	29 August	Air attack	Sunk by German aircraft
VT-547 Järvamaa	Transport	30 August	Air attack	Listed among transport losses
Serp i Molot	Floating workshop / steamer	30 August	Air attack	Damaged or sunk during air attacks, depending on source
VT-581 Lake Lucerne	Transport	28–30 August	Air attack	Also given as Lucerne; reported sunk during German air attacks
VT-505 Ivan Papanin	Transport	30 August	Air attack	Damaged; later accounts differ on final status
VT-529 Skrunda	Transport	30 August	Air attack	Reported sunk after taking survivors from damaged vessels
VT-550 Šiauliai	Transport	2 September	Air attack	Lost after the main passage
VT-523 Kazakhstan	Transport	During passage	Air attack	Damaged; disembarked many passengers and later reached Kronstadt
SS Eestirand / VT-532	Cargo ship / transport	24 August	Air attack	Damaged by German bombers and beached on Prangli; at least 44 people died in the initial attack

== Memory and commemoration ==
The disaster was long downplayed in Soviet public memory, but it became a major subject of later Estonian, Finnish, Russian and naval-historical writing. A memorial to the victims was erected at the northern tip of the Juminda Peninsula in 1981 and restored in 1995. On 25 August 2001 the President of Estonia sent a wreath to the memorial of the victims of the Juminda mine battle. The 80th anniversary of the evacuation was marked by exhibitions and commemorations in Estonia and Russia. The Estonian Maritime Museum in Tallinn opened an exhibition titled Hell in the Baltic Sea: The Tragedy of the Tallinn Passage 1941, devoted to the evacuation and the losses in the Gulf of Finland.

== See also ==
- Battle of Tallinn
- List of shipwrecks in August 1941
- Baltic Sea campaigns (1939–1945)
- Continuation War
- Summer War
- Soviet occupation of the Baltic states (1940)
- Siege of Leningrad
