= Prangli =

Island in Estonia

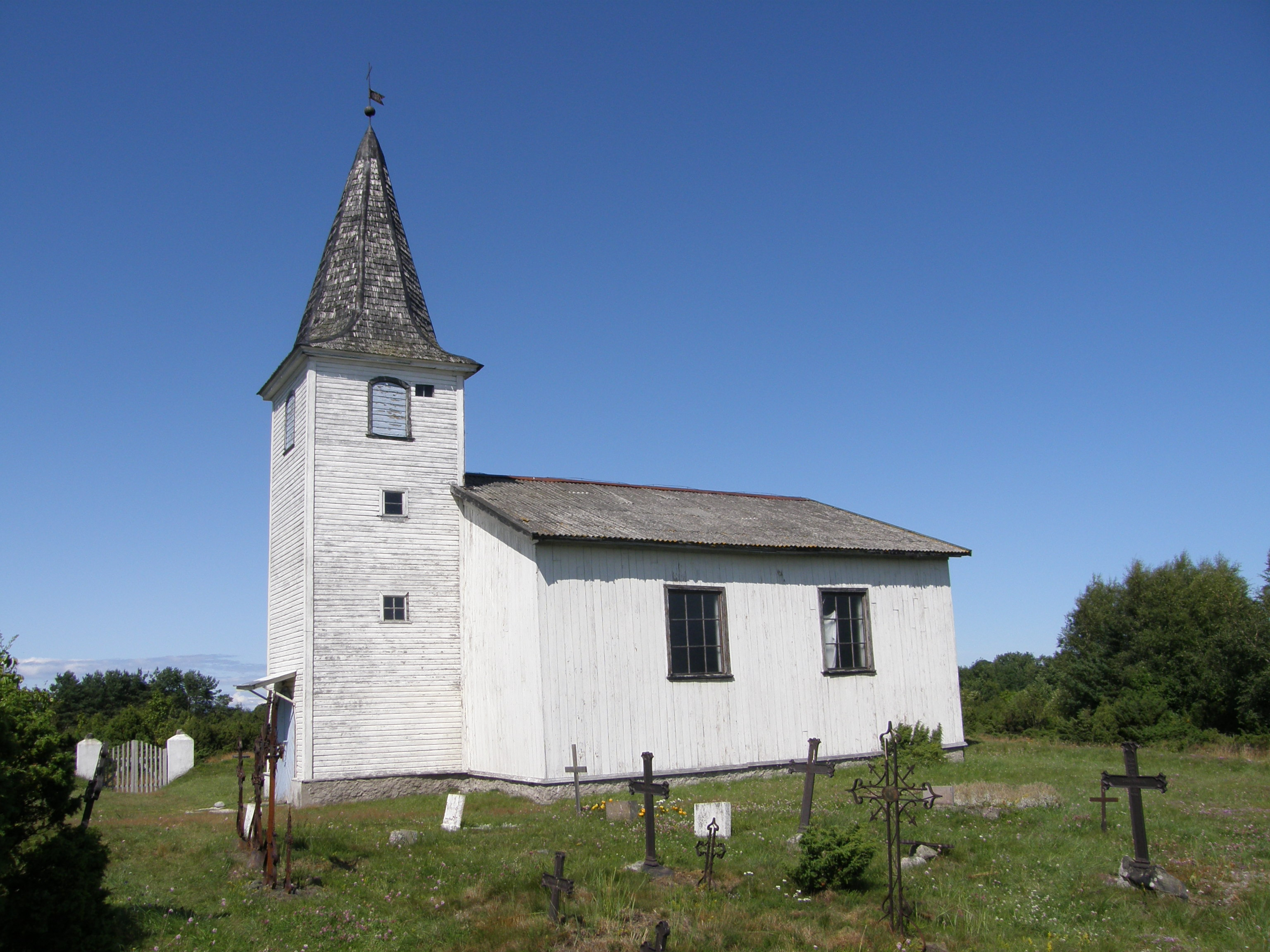
- Prangli church
- Interactive map of Prangli

Geography
- Location: Baltic Sea
- Coordinates: 59°37′28″N 25°01′15″E
- Area: 6.44 km^{2} (2.49 sq mi)
- Highest elevation: 9 m (30 ft)

Administration
- Estonia
- County: Harju

Demographics
- Population: 151
- Pop. density: 23/km^{2} (60/sq mi)

Prangli (Swedish: Vrangö) is an Estonian island in the Gulf of Finland.

The earliest known written records of Prangli date from 1387, the island was then called Rango, and it had been settled by Swedes. The first Estonian-speaking inhabitants are known to have lived on the island in the 17th century.

Prangli is part of Viimsi Parish. In Kelnase is a harbour which is connected by ferry to Leppneeme on the mainland.

The vegetation, especially in the east of the island, is mainly fir trees.

The lighthouse on Prangli was built in 1923.

In 1941, the Estonian steamship Eestirand was shipwrecked off the coast of Prangli Island after a German air attack. The Eestirand was part of a fleet of ships carrying Soviet troops to Leningrad during the Soviet evacuation of Tallinn. The Estonian crew and conscripts managed to disarm Soviet military personnel aboard the ship and take control of the island, hoisting the flag of the Estonian Republic up a tall pine tree. The revolt saved approximately 2,700 conscripts, most of whom were Estonian, from being mobilized to Leningrad. After the war, a memorial was placed on the island in honor of those who died in the tragedy.

== Gallery ==
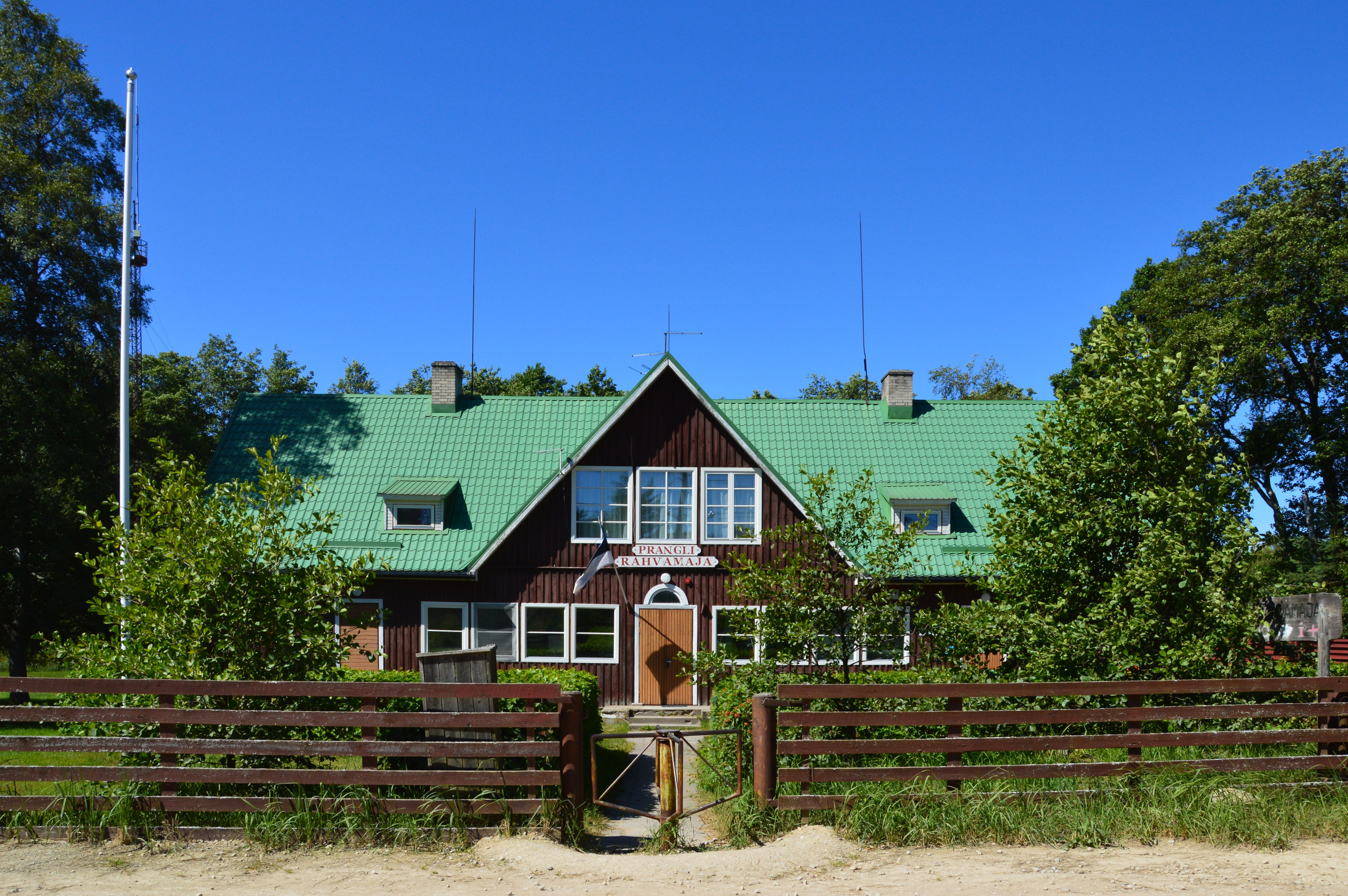
House of culture

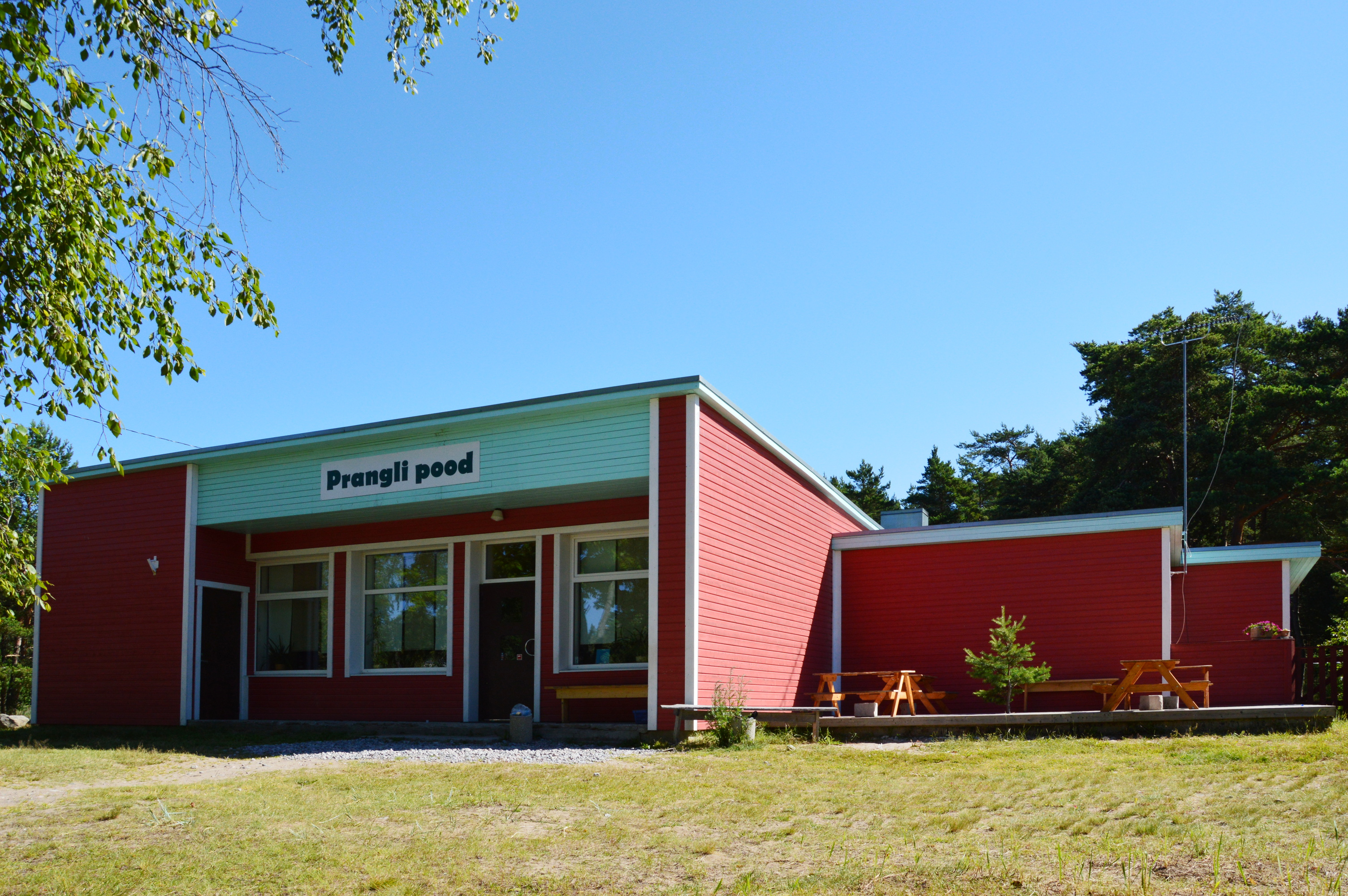
Local store

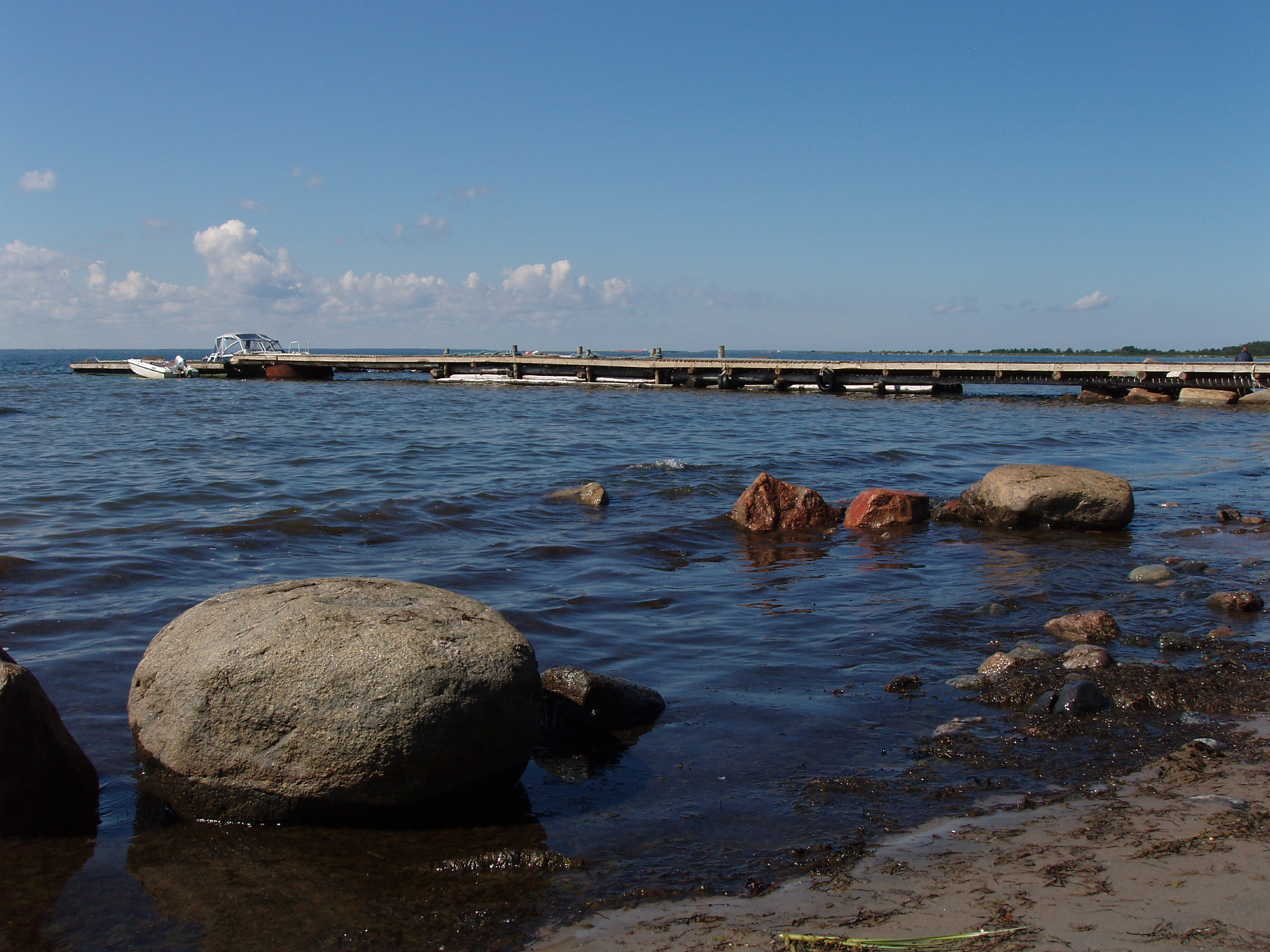
Mälgi harbour

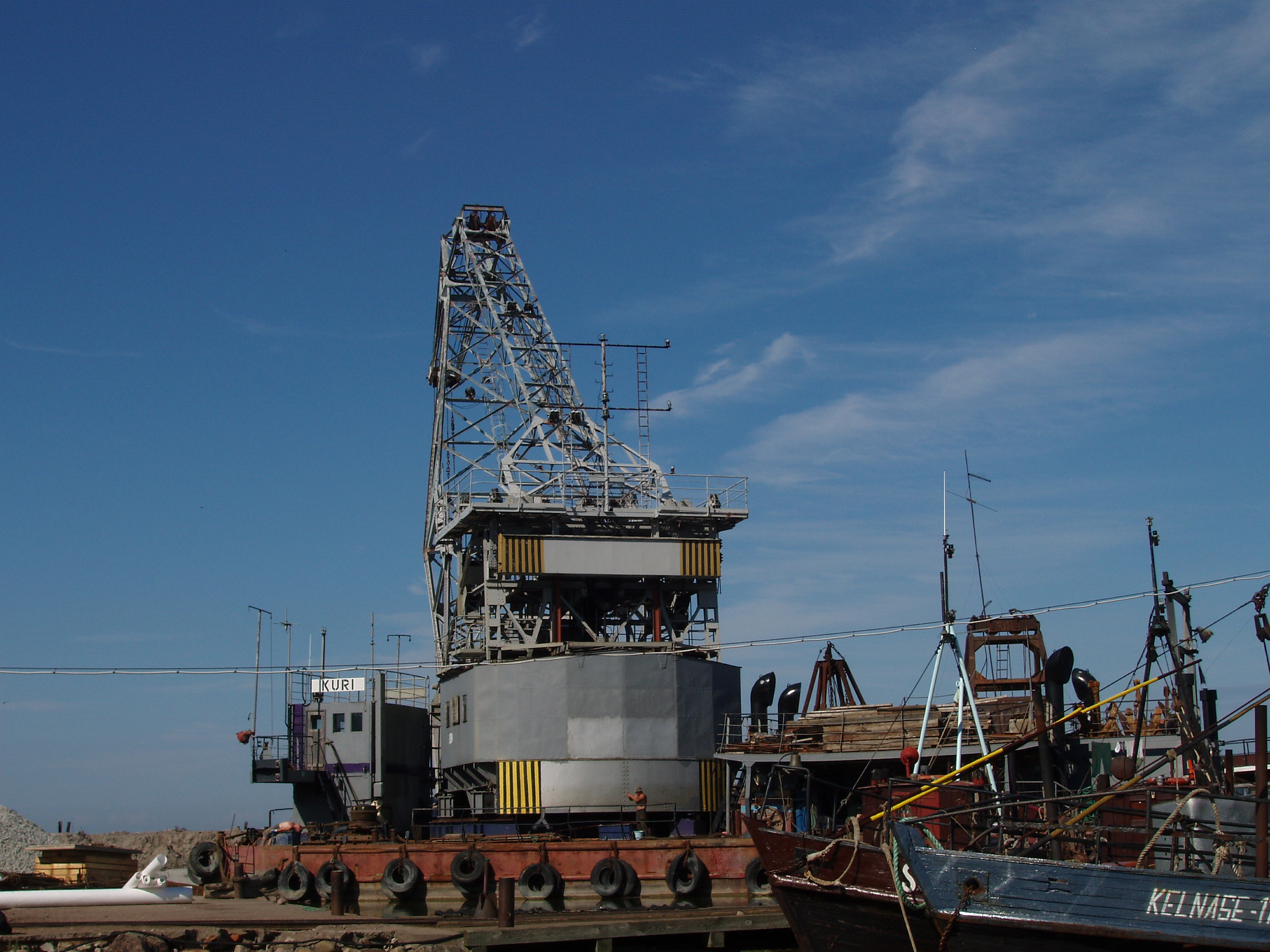
Kelnase harbour

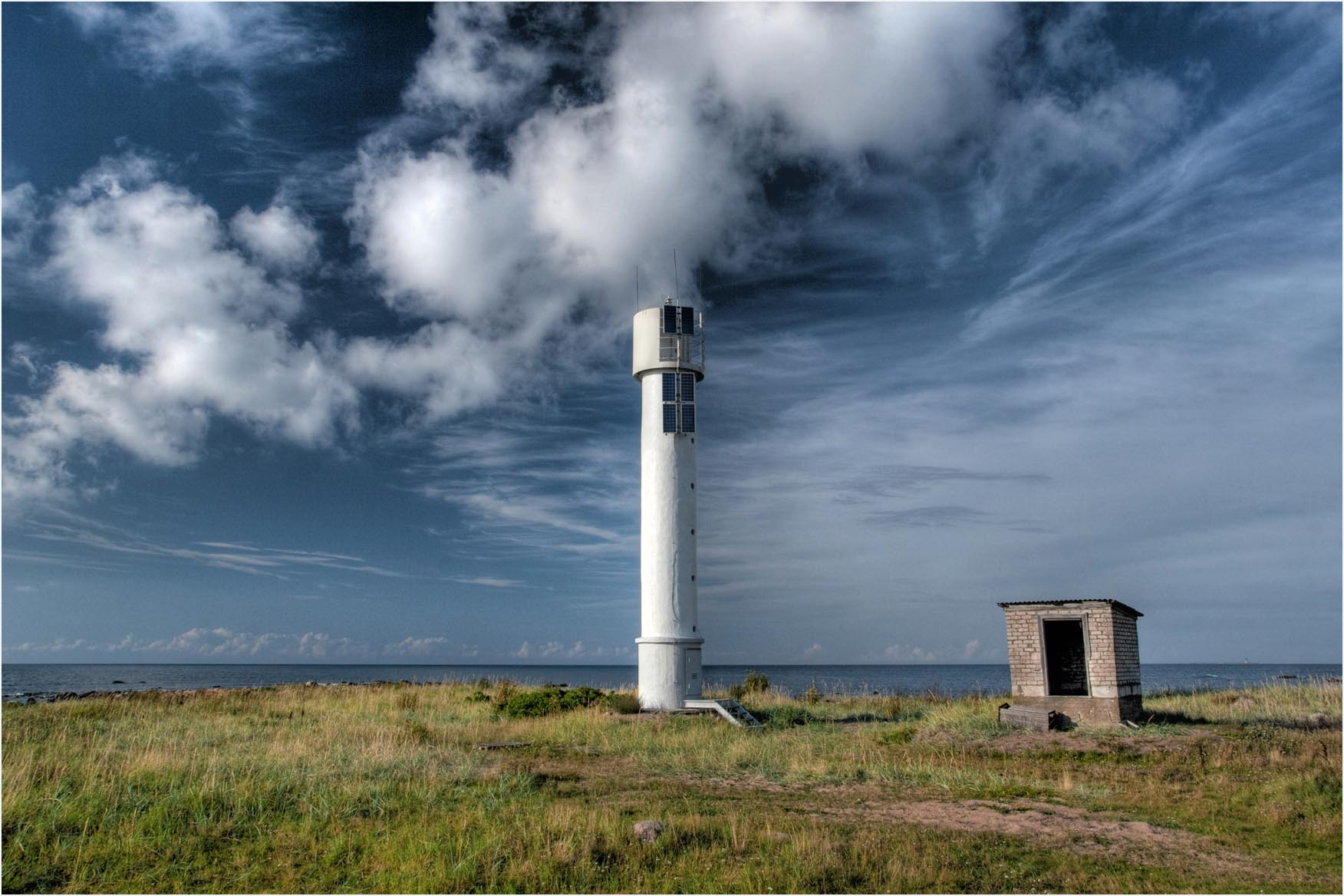
Prangli NW light beacon

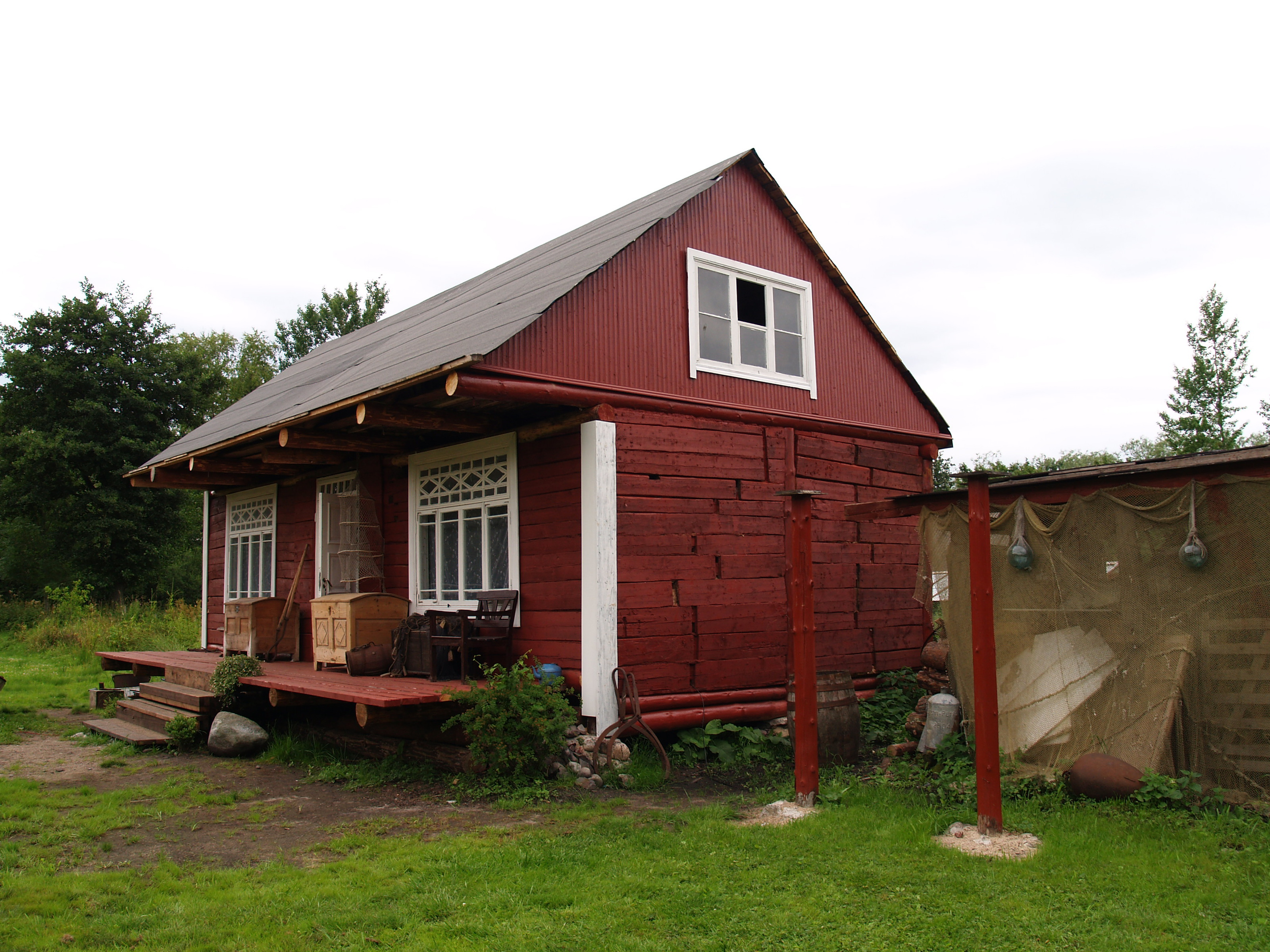
Museum

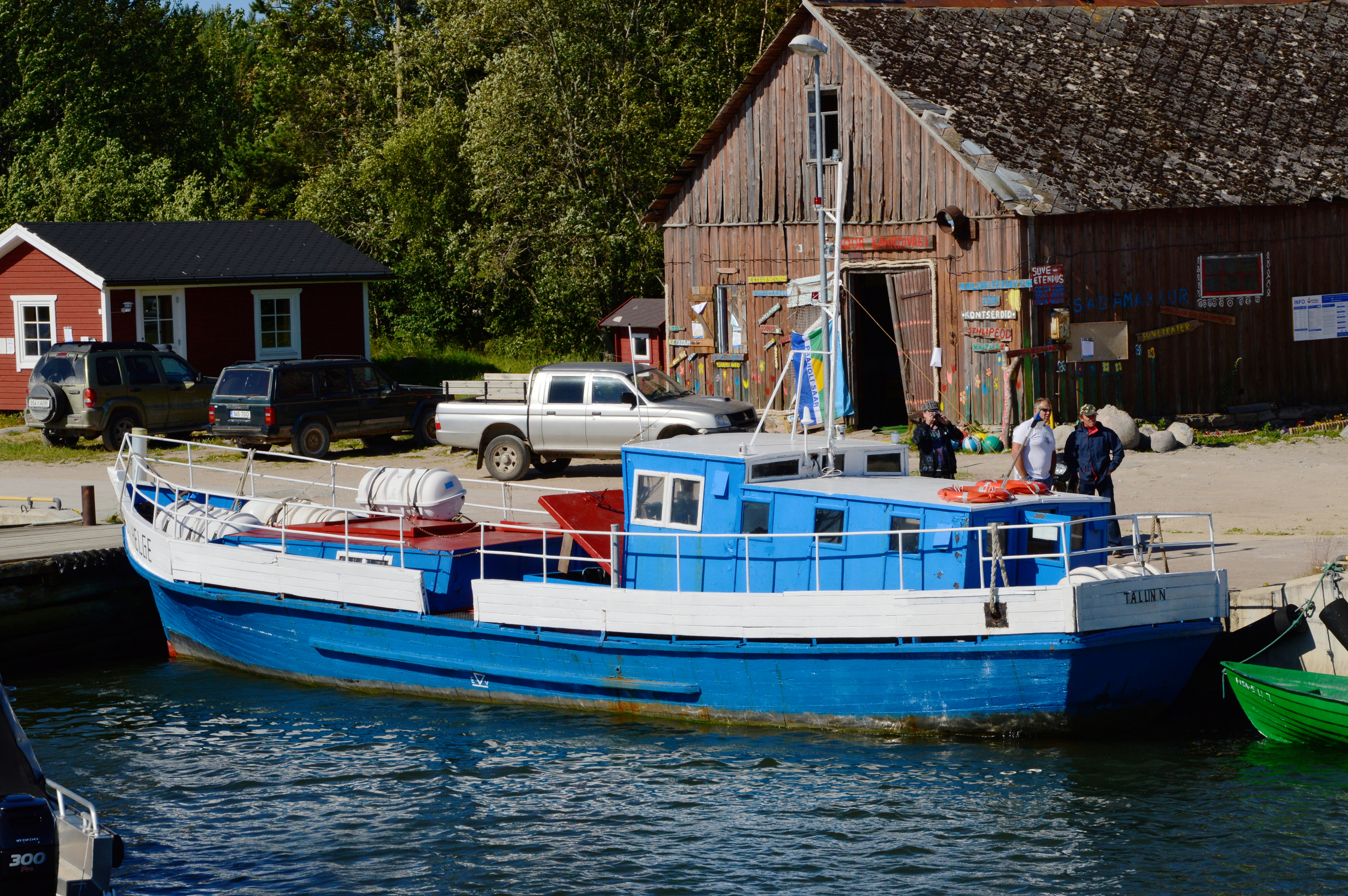
Boat Helge

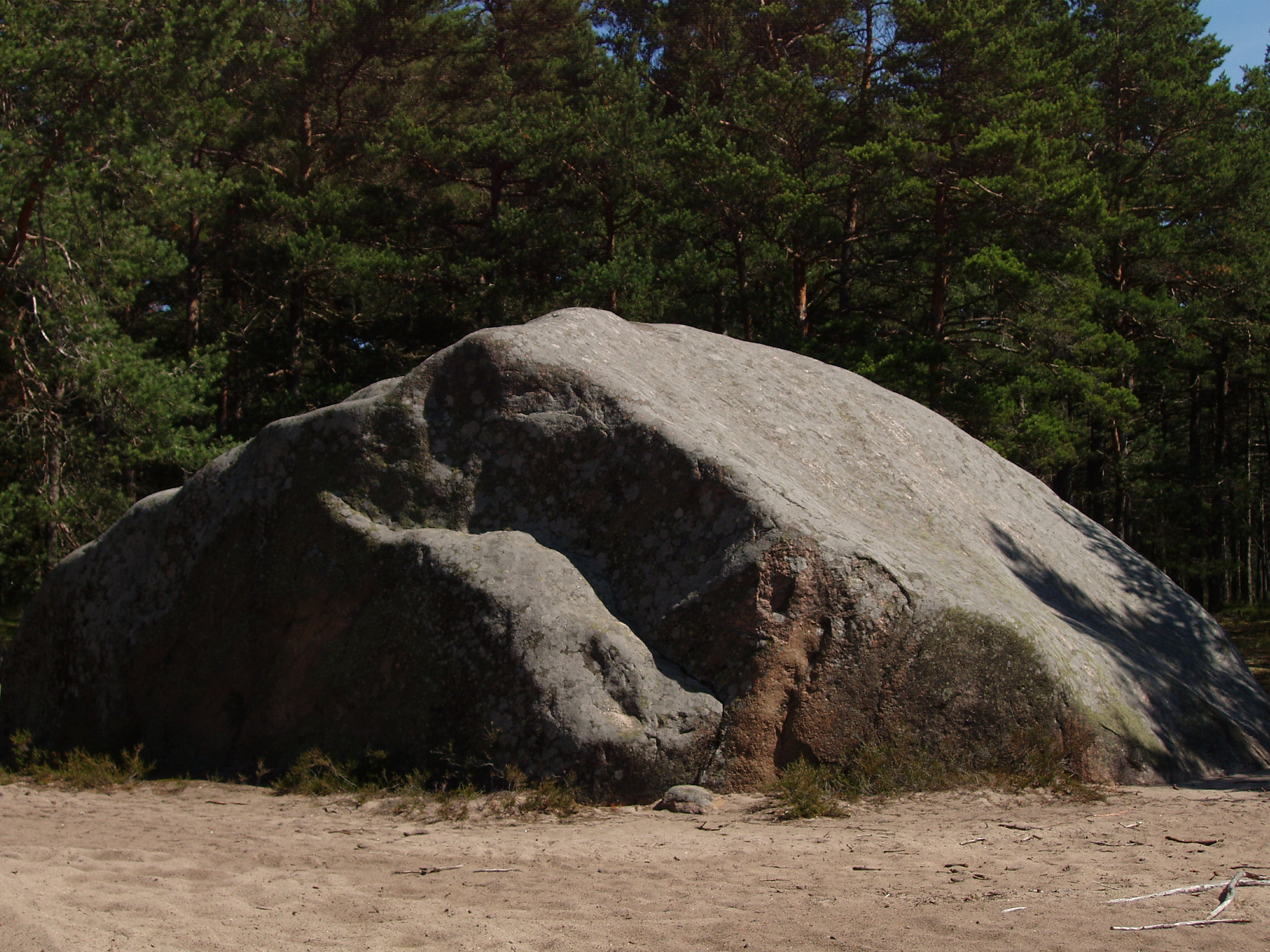
Glacial erratic

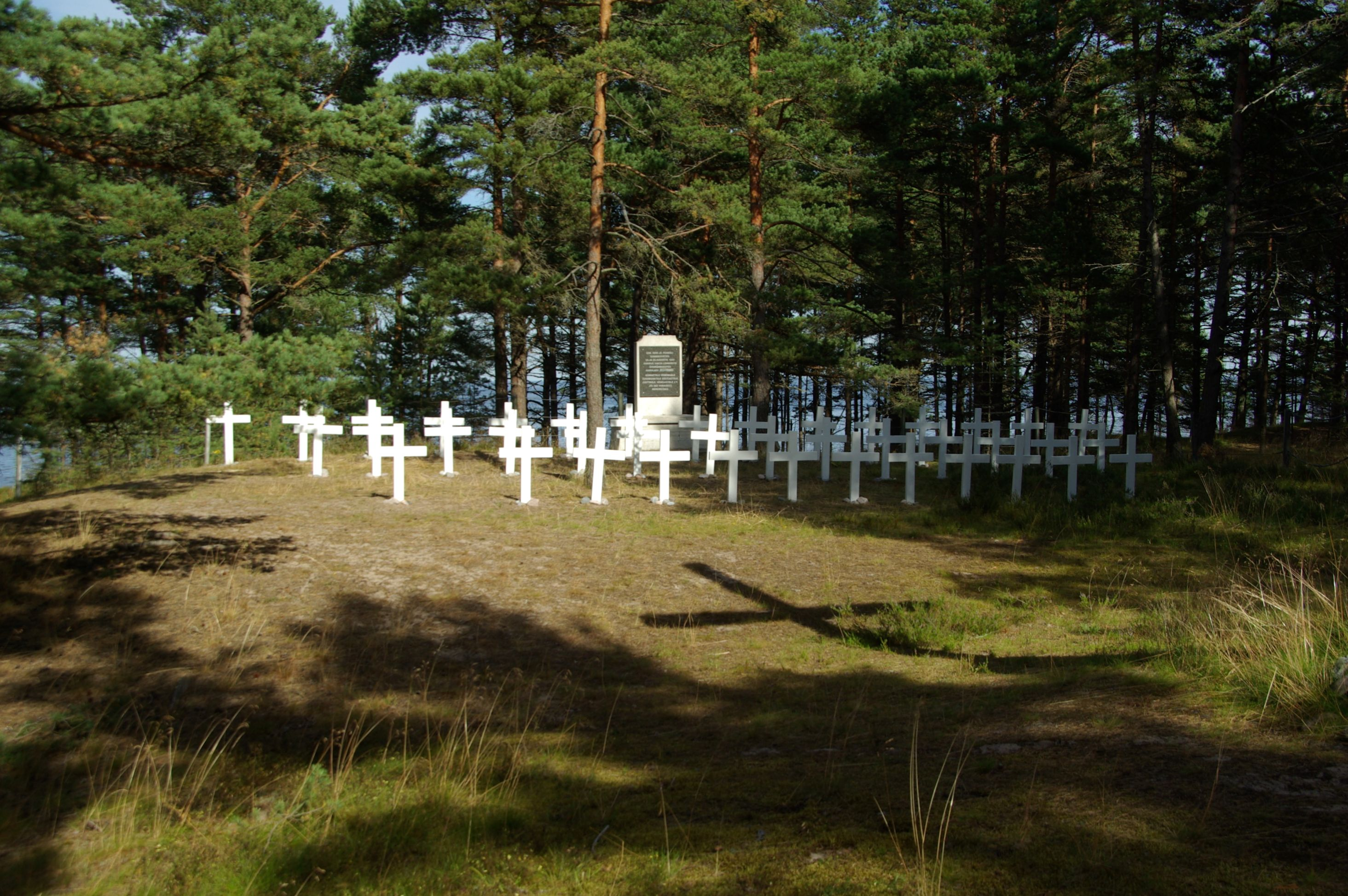
Eestirand Memorial site

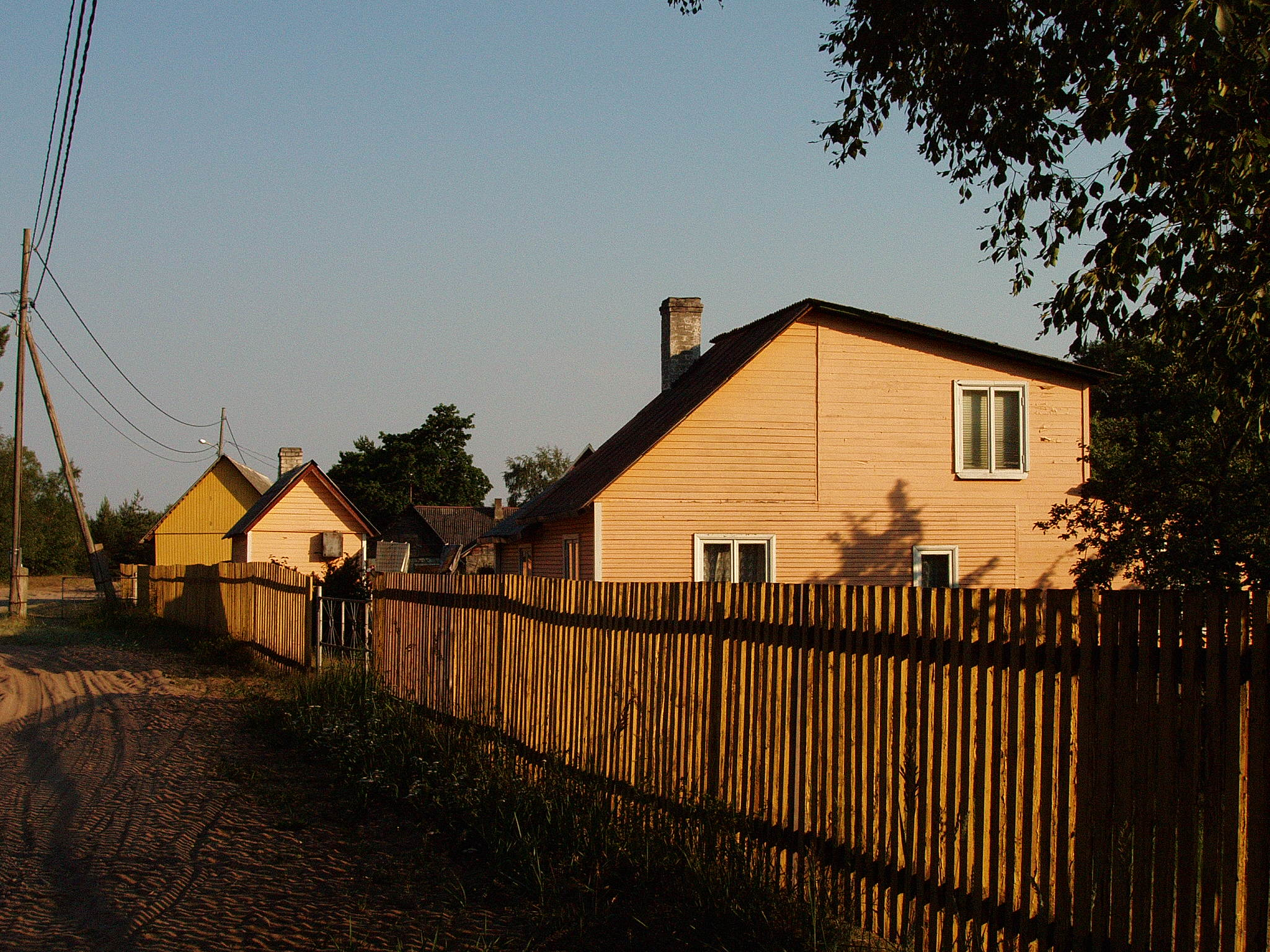
Buildings in Prangli

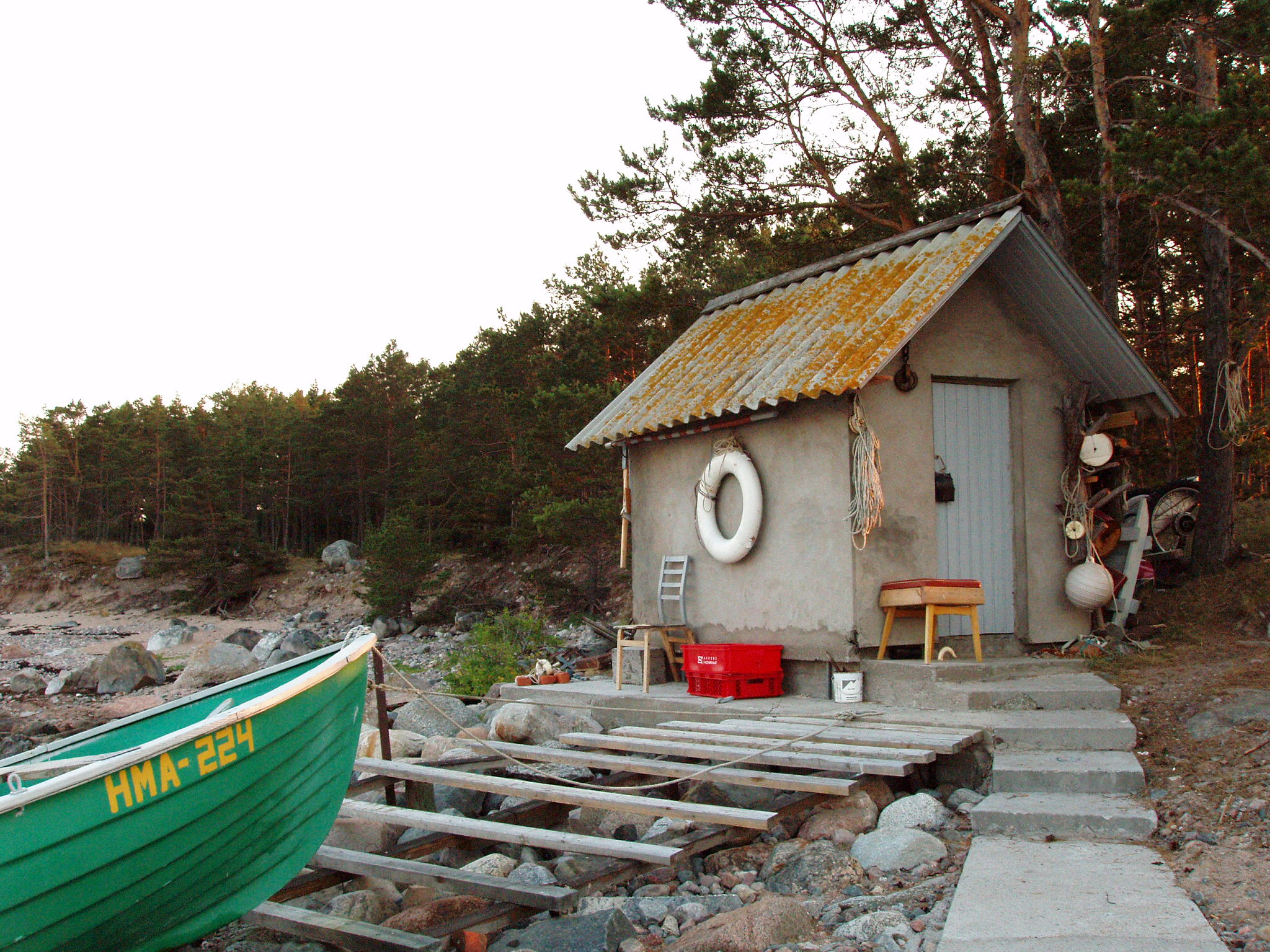
Hut

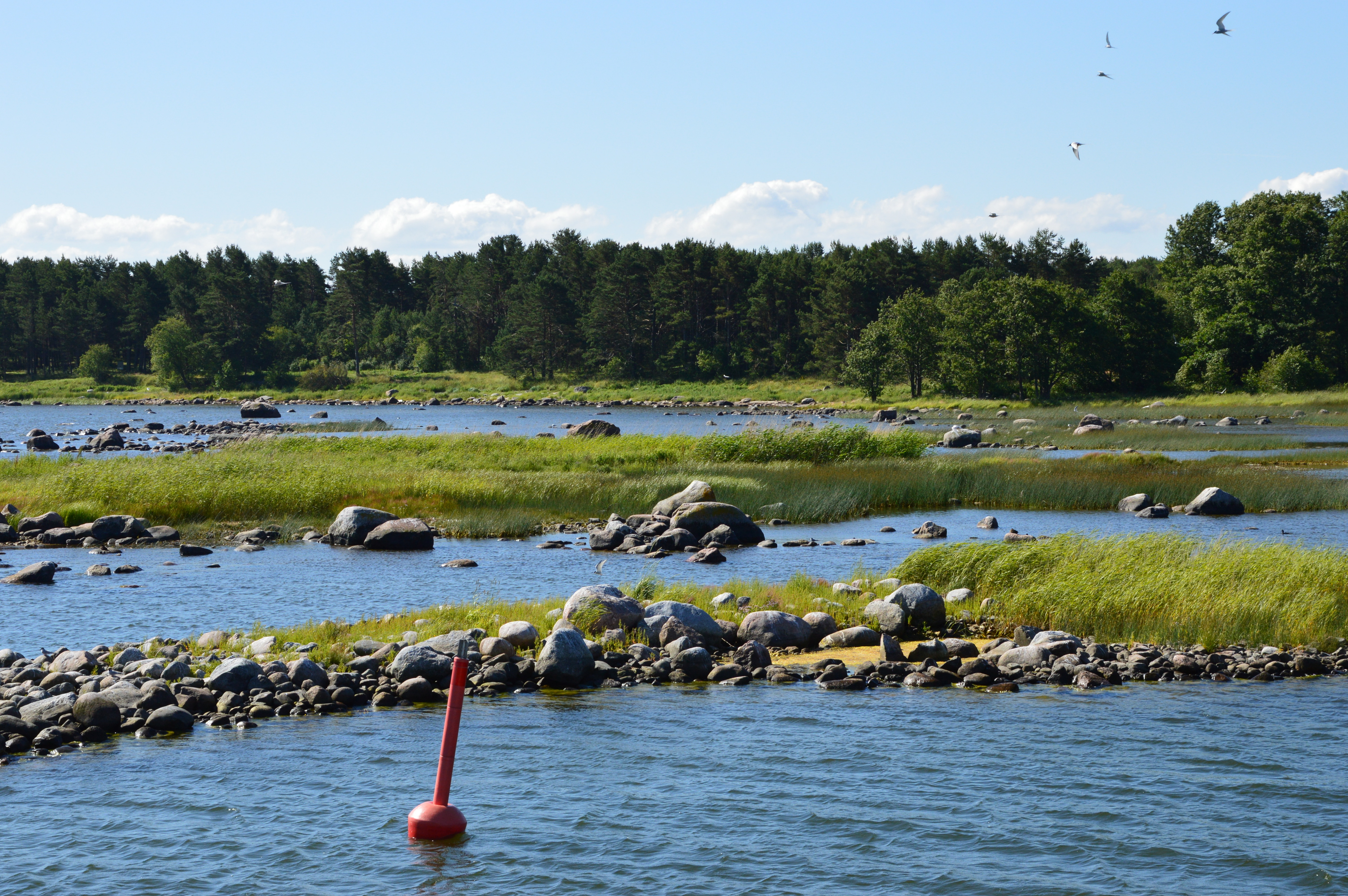
Coast
