= Vihula =

Village in Estonia

Coordinates: 59°33′N 26°09′E

- Village
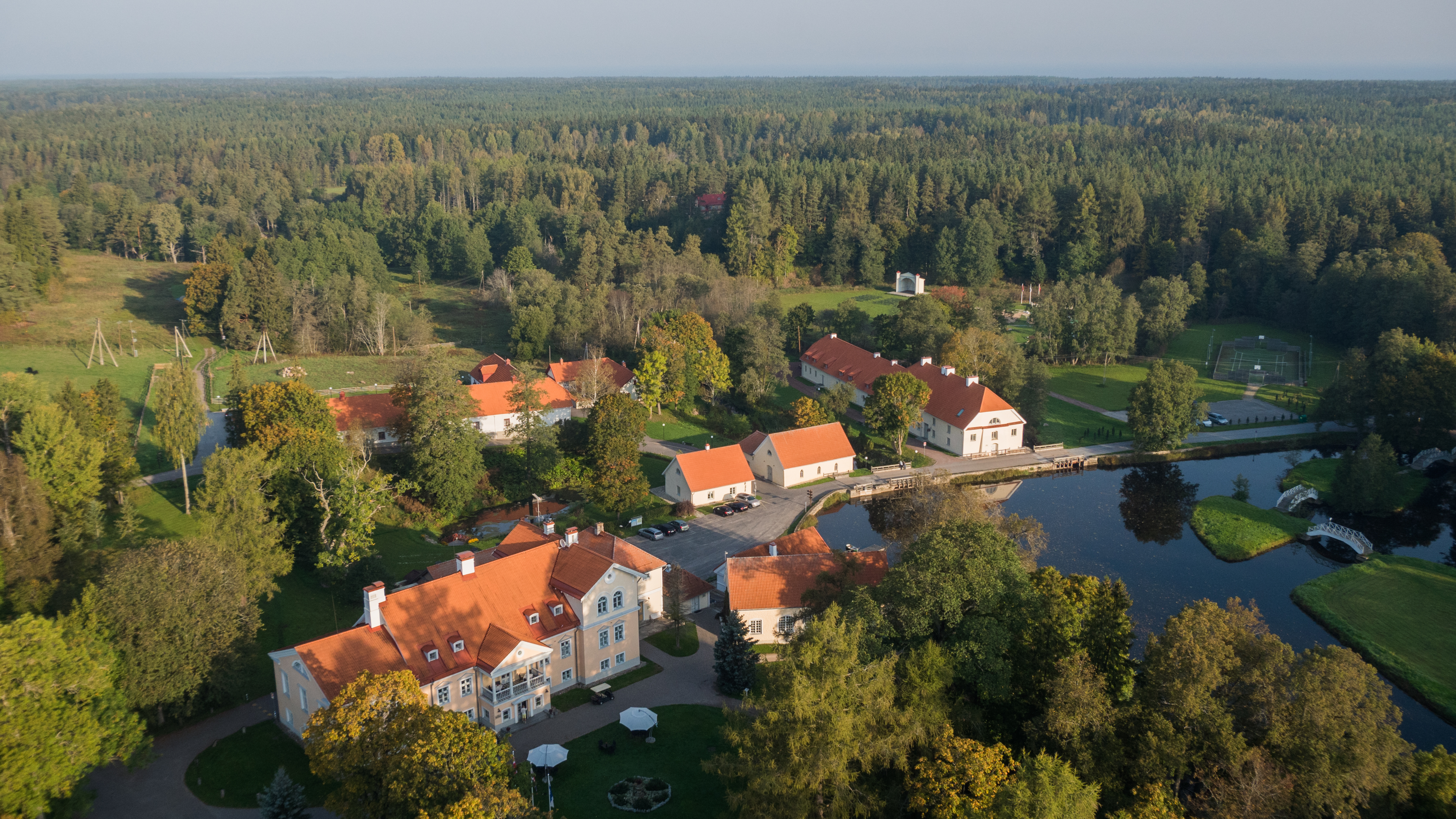
- Vihula manor complex
- Interactive map of Vihula
- Country: Estonia
- County: Lääne-Viru County
- Parish: Haljala Parish
- Time zone: UTC+2 (EET)
  - Summer (DST): UTC+3 (EEST)

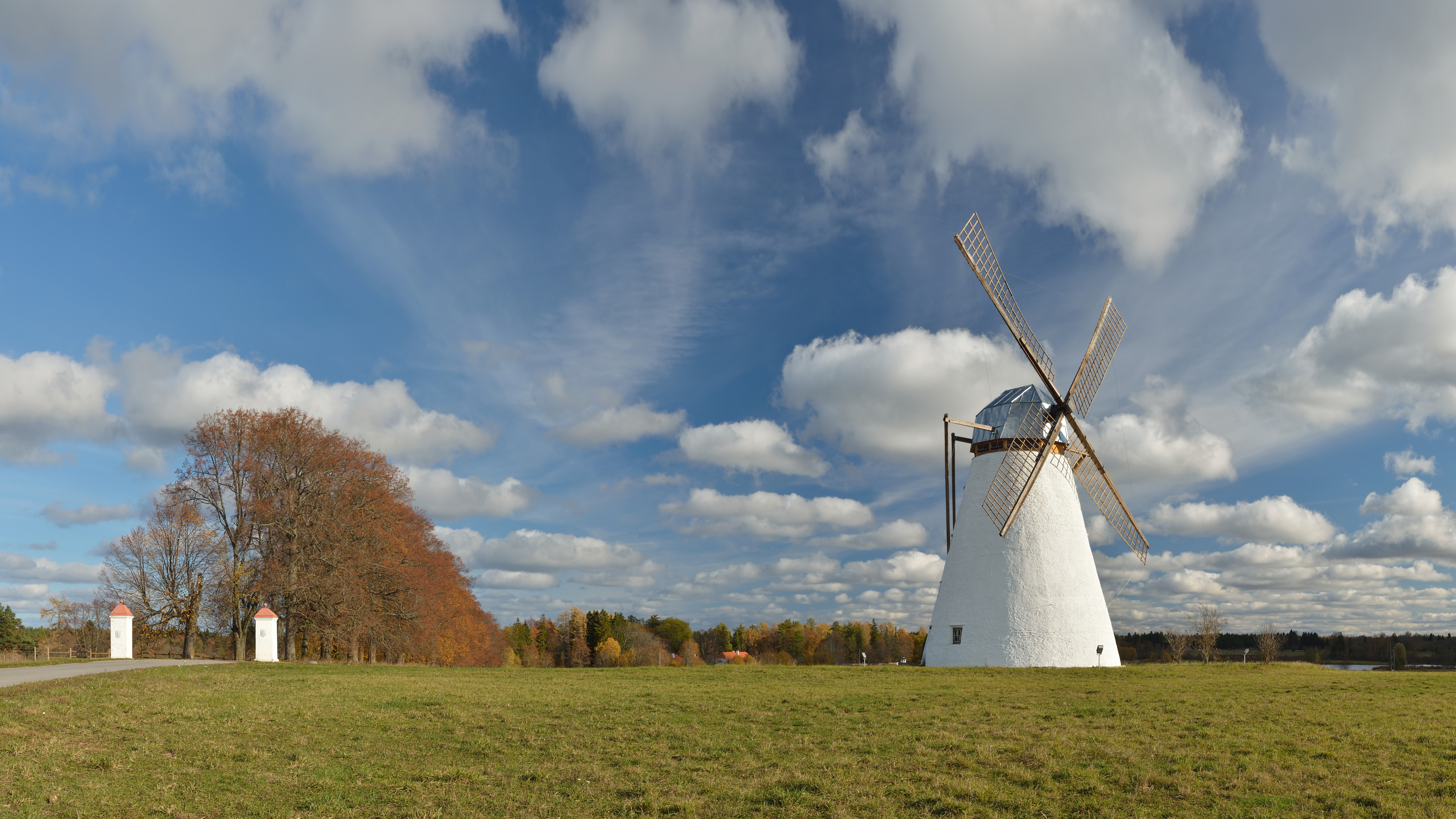
Vihula windmill

Vihula (German: Viol) is a village in Haljala Parish, Lääne-Viru County, in northern Estonia, within Lahemaa National Park.

== Name ==
Vihula was attested in historical sources as Viola in 1241, Vyol in 1402, Fioell in 1516, and Wihhola in 1796, among other spellings. The Finnish linguist Lauri Kettunen derived the name from the adjective viha 'bitter', connecting it with the common Finnish place name Viho(i)la and the personal name Viho(i)nen. The historian Enn Tarvel derived the name from the ancient personal name Viho or Vihoi.

== Vihula Manor ==
The earliest references to an estate go back to 1501. During much of its history, it has belonged to Baltic German aristocratic families. During the Soviet occupation of Estonia, the manor housed a collective farm. The present main building, designed by Friedrich Modi, dates from after 1892, when the earlier house was destroyed in a fire. It is an irregular building with neo-Renaissance details. Several of the older outbuildings, such as a palm house and a "coffee house", also survive and together contribute to the present ensemble.

== See also ==
- Lahemaa National Park
